

314001–314100 

|-bgcolor=#d6d6d6
| 314001 ||  || — || October 15, 2004 || Anderson Mesa || LONEOS || HYG || align=right | 4.0 km || 
|-id=002 bgcolor=#d6d6d6
| 314002 ||  || — || October 4, 2004 || Kitt Peak || Spacewatch || — || align=right | 3.0 km || 
|-id=003 bgcolor=#d6d6d6
| 314003 ||  || — || October 9, 2004 || Anderson Mesa || LONEOS || EOS || align=right | 3.1 km || 
|-id=004 bgcolor=#FA8072
| 314004 ||  || — || October 9, 2004 || Socorro || LINEAR || — || align=right data-sort-value="0.94" | 940 m || 
|-id=005 bgcolor=#FA8072
| 314005 || 2004 UK || — || October 18, 2004 || Socorro || LINEAR || — || align=right | 1.4 km || 
|-id=006 bgcolor=#fefefe
| 314006 ||  || — || October 16, 2004 || Socorro || LINEAR || — || align=right | 1.0 km || 
|-id=007 bgcolor=#fefefe
| 314007 ||  || — || October 19, 2004 || Socorro || LINEAR || — || align=right | 1.0 km || 
|-id=008 bgcolor=#fefefe
| 314008 ||  || — || October 21, 2004 || Socorro || LINEAR || — || align=right data-sort-value="0.86" | 860 m || 
|-id=009 bgcolor=#d6d6d6
| 314009 ||  || — || November 4, 2004 || Catalina || CSS || — || align=right | 4.5 km || 
|-id=010 bgcolor=#fefefe
| 314010 ||  || — || November 5, 2004 || Palomar || NEAT || — || align=right | 1.3 km || 
|-id=011 bgcolor=#d6d6d6
| 314011 ||  || — || November 4, 2004 || Catalina || CSS || — || align=right | 3.9 km || 
|-id=012 bgcolor=#fefefe
| 314012 ||  || — || November 10, 2004 || Kitt Peak || Spacewatch || — || align=right | 1.2 km || 
|-id=013 bgcolor=#fefefe
| 314013 ||  || — || November 4, 2004 || Kitt Peak || Spacewatch || — || align=right data-sort-value="0.61" | 610 m || 
|-id=014 bgcolor=#d6d6d6
| 314014 ||  || — || November 9, 2004 || Mauna Kea || C. Veillet || THM || align=right | 2.5 km || 
|-id=015 bgcolor=#d6d6d6
| 314015 ||  || — || November 2, 2004 || Anderson Mesa || LONEOS || — || align=right | 4.7 km || 
|-id=016 bgcolor=#fefefe
| 314016 ||  || — || November 4, 2004 || Kitt Peak || Spacewatch || — || align=right data-sort-value="0.73" | 730 m || 
|-id=017 bgcolor=#d6d6d6
| 314017 ||  || — || November 17, 2004 || Campo Imperatore || CINEOS || — || align=right | 4.9 km || 
|-id=018 bgcolor=#d6d6d6
| 314018 ||  || — || November 19, 2004 || Socorro || LINEAR || — || align=right | 5.1 km || 
|-id=019 bgcolor=#fefefe
| 314019 ||  || — || November 17, 2004 || Campo Imperatore || CINEOS || — || align=right data-sort-value="0.68" | 680 m || 
|-id=020 bgcolor=#fefefe
| 314020 ||  || — || December 2, 2004 || Catalina || CSS || — || align=right | 1.2 km || 
|-id=021 bgcolor=#fefefe
| 314021 ||  || — || December 8, 2004 || Socorro || LINEAR || — || align=right data-sort-value="0.89" | 890 m || 
|-id=022 bgcolor=#fefefe
| 314022 ||  || — || December 8, 2004 || Socorro || LINEAR || FLO || align=right data-sort-value="0.98" | 980 m || 
|-id=023 bgcolor=#fefefe
| 314023 ||  || — || December 9, 2004 || Catalina || CSS || — || align=right data-sort-value="0.99" | 990 m || 
|-id=024 bgcolor=#fefefe
| 314024 ||  || — || December 10, 2004 || Campo Imperatore || CINEOS || — || align=right data-sort-value="0.85" | 850 m || 
|-id=025 bgcolor=#fefefe
| 314025 ||  || — || December 10, 2004 || Socorro || LINEAR || — || align=right data-sort-value="0.92" | 920 m || 
|-id=026 bgcolor=#fefefe
| 314026 ||  || — || December 10, 2004 || Socorro || LINEAR || — || align=right | 1.1 km || 
|-id=027 bgcolor=#fefefe
| 314027 ||  || — || December 10, 2004 || Socorro || LINEAR || FLO || align=right data-sort-value="0.84" | 840 m || 
|-id=028 bgcolor=#fefefe
| 314028 ||  || — || December 2, 2004 || Kitt Peak || Spacewatch || — || align=right data-sort-value="0.79" | 790 m || 
|-id=029 bgcolor=#fefefe
| 314029 ||  || — || December 10, 2004 || Kitt Peak || Spacewatch || FLO || align=right data-sort-value="0.77" | 770 m || 
|-id=030 bgcolor=#fefefe
| 314030 ||  || — || December 11, 2004 || Kitt Peak || Spacewatch || — || align=right data-sort-value="0.85" | 850 m || 
|-id=031 bgcolor=#fefefe
| 314031 ||  || — || December 11, 2004 || Socorro || LINEAR || FLO || align=right data-sort-value="0.95" | 950 m || 
|-id=032 bgcolor=#fefefe
| 314032 ||  || — || December 11, 2004 || Catalina || CSS || — || align=right data-sort-value="0.73" | 730 m || 
|-id=033 bgcolor=#fefefe
| 314033 ||  || — || December 11, 2004 || Catalina || CSS || — || align=right data-sort-value="0.85" | 850 m || 
|-id=034 bgcolor=#fefefe
| 314034 ||  || — || December 12, 2004 || Kitt Peak || Spacewatch || — || align=right data-sort-value="0.80" | 800 m || 
|-id=035 bgcolor=#fefefe
| 314035 ||  || — || December 9, 2004 || Kitt Peak || Spacewatch || — || align=right data-sort-value="0.79" | 790 m || 
|-id=036 bgcolor=#d6d6d6
| 314036 ||  || — || December 16, 2004 || Socorro || LINEAR || — || align=right | 5.1 km || 
|-id=037 bgcolor=#fefefe
| 314037 ||  || — || December 18, 2004 || Mount Lemmon || Mount Lemmon Survey || FLO || align=right data-sort-value="0.74" | 740 m || 
|-id=038 bgcolor=#fefefe
| 314038 ||  || — || December 16, 2004 || Anderson Mesa || LONEOS || — || align=right data-sort-value="0.97" | 970 m || 
|-id=039 bgcolor=#fefefe
| 314039 ||  || — || December 20, 2004 || Mount Lemmon || Mount Lemmon Survey || V || align=right data-sort-value="0.77" | 770 m || 
|-id=040 bgcolor=#fefefe
| 314040 Tavannes ||  ||  || January 4, 2005 || Vicques || M. Ory || FLO || align=right data-sort-value="0.79" | 790 m || 
|-id=041 bgcolor=#fefefe
| 314041 ||  || — || January 6, 2005 || Catalina || CSS || — || align=right data-sort-value="0.88" | 880 m || 
|-id=042 bgcolor=#fefefe
| 314042 ||  || — || January 6, 2005 || Catalina || CSS || — || align=right | 1.1 km || 
|-id=043 bgcolor=#fefefe
| 314043 ||  || — || January 6, 2005 || Catalina || CSS || FLO || align=right data-sort-value="0.83" | 830 m || 
|-id=044 bgcolor=#fefefe
| 314044 ||  || — || January 6, 2005 || Catalina || CSS || — || align=right data-sort-value="0.80" | 800 m || 
|-id=045 bgcolor=#fefefe
| 314045 ||  || — || January 6, 2005 || Catalina || CSS || V || align=right data-sort-value="0.82" | 820 m || 
|-id=046 bgcolor=#fefefe
| 314046 ||  || — || January 6, 2005 || Catalina || CSS || — || align=right | 1.2 km || 
|-id=047 bgcolor=#fefefe
| 314047 ||  || — || January 7, 2005 || Socorro || LINEAR || — || align=right data-sort-value="0.80" | 800 m || 
|-id=048 bgcolor=#fefefe
| 314048 ||  || — || January 6, 2005 || Catalina || CSS || — || align=right data-sort-value="0.90" | 900 m || 
|-id=049 bgcolor=#fefefe
| 314049 ||  || — || January 7, 2005 || Socorro || LINEAR || FLO || align=right data-sort-value="0.85" | 850 m || 
|-id=050 bgcolor=#fefefe
| 314050 ||  || — || January 6, 2005 || Socorro || LINEAR || — || align=right data-sort-value="0.94" | 940 m || 
|-id=051 bgcolor=#fefefe
| 314051 ||  || — || January 6, 2005 || Catalina || CSS || NYS || align=right data-sort-value="0.70" | 700 m || 
|-id=052 bgcolor=#fefefe
| 314052 ||  || — || January 7, 2005 || Kitt Peak || Spacewatch || — || align=right data-sort-value="0.98" | 980 m || 
|-id=053 bgcolor=#fefefe
| 314053 ||  || — || January 14, 2005 || Kvistaberg || UDAS || — || align=right data-sort-value="0.91" | 910 m || 
|-id=054 bgcolor=#fefefe
| 314054 ||  || — || January 13, 2005 || Kitt Peak || Spacewatch || MAS || align=right data-sort-value="0.69" | 690 m || 
|-id=055 bgcolor=#fefefe
| 314055 ||  || — || January 13, 2005 || Socorro || LINEAR || — || align=right data-sort-value="0.94" | 940 m || 
|-id=056 bgcolor=#fefefe
| 314056 ||  || — || January 13, 2005 || Kitt Peak || Spacewatch || NYS || align=right data-sort-value="0.68" | 680 m || 
|-id=057 bgcolor=#fefefe
| 314057 ||  || — || January 13, 2005 || Socorro || LINEAR || — || align=right | 1.0 km || 
|-id=058 bgcolor=#fefefe
| 314058 ||  || — || January 15, 2005 || Kitt Peak || Spacewatch || — || align=right data-sort-value="0.99" | 990 m || 
|-id=059 bgcolor=#fefefe
| 314059 ||  || — || January 13, 2005 || Catalina || CSS || — || align=right | 2.3 km || 
|-id=060 bgcolor=#fefefe
| 314060 ||  || — || January 15, 2005 || Socorro || LINEAR || — || align=right data-sort-value="0.99" | 990 m || 
|-id=061 bgcolor=#fefefe
| 314061 ||  || — || January 15, 2005 || Kitt Peak || Spacewatch || NYS || align=right data-sort-value="0.77" | 770 m || 
|-id=062 bgcolor=#fefefe
| 314062 ||  || — || January 15, 2005 || Kitt Peak || Spacewatch || — || align=right data-sort-value="0.96" | 960 m || 
|-id=063 bgcolor=#fefefe
| 314063 ||  || — || January 15, 2005 || Kitt Peak || Spacewatch || NYS || align=right data-sort-value="0.64" | 640 m || 
|-id=064 bgcolor=#fefefe
| 314064 ||  || — || January 16, 2005 || Socorro || LINEAR || V || align=right data-sort-value="0.82" | 820 m || 
|-id=065 bgcolor=#fefefe
| 314065 ||  || — || January 16, 2005 || Socorro || LINEAR || — || align=right | 1.1 km || 
|-id=066 bgcolor=#fefefe
| 314066 ||  || — || January 16, 2005 || Socorro || LINEAR || FLO || align=right data-sort-value="0.79" | 790 m || 
|-id=067 bgcolor=#fefefe
| 314067 ||  || — || January 16, 2005 || Kitt Peak || Spacewatch || V || align=right data-sort-value="0.78" | 780 m || 
|-id=068 bgcolor=#fefefe
| 314068 ||  || — || January 16, 2005 || Kitt Peak || Spacewatch || — || align=right data-sort-value="0.78" | 780 m || 
|-id=069 bgcolor=#fefefe
| 314069 ||  || — || January 18, 2005 || Catalina || CSS || PHO || align=right | 1.2 km || 
|-id=070 bgcolor=#fefefe
| 314070 ||  || — || February 1, 2005 || Catalina || CSS || — || align=right data-sort-value="0.78" | 780 m || 
|-id=071 bgcolor=#fefefe
| 314071 ||  || — || February 1, 2005 || Catalina || CSS || — || align=right data-sort-value="0.86" | 860 m || 
|-id=072 bgcolor=#fefefe
| 314072 ||  || — || February 1, 2005 || Catalina || CSS || PHO || align=right | 1.7 km || 
|-id=073 bgcolor=#fefefe
| 314073 ||  || — || February 3, 2005 || Palomar || NEAT || — || align=right | 2.1 km || 
|-id=074 bgcolor=#fefefe
| 314074 ||  || — || February 1, 2005 || Kitt Peak || Spacewatch || — || align=right | 1.00 km || 
|-id=075 bgcolor=#fefefe
| 314075 ||  || — || February 1, 2005 || Kitt Peak || Spacewatch || — || align=right data-sort-value="0.81" | 810 m || 
|-id=076 bgcolor=#fefefe
| 314076 ||  || — || February 2, 2005 || Socorro || LINEAR || — || align=right data-sort-value="0.74" | 740 m || 
|-id=077 bgcolor=#fefefe
| 314077 ||  || — || February 3, 2005 || Socorro || LINEAR || — || align=right data-sort-value="0.94" | 940 m || 
|-id=078 bgcolor=#fefefe
| 314078 ||  || — || February 1, 2005 || Catalina || CSS || FLO || align=right | 1.1 km || 
|-id=079 bgcolor=#FFC2E0
| 314079 ||  || — || February 4, 2005 || Kitt Peak || Spacewatch || APO || align=right data-sort-value="0.43" | 430 m || 
|-id=080 bgcolor=#fefefe
| 314080 ||  || — || February 1, 2005 || Kitt Peak || Spacewatch || — || align=right data-sort-value="0.81" | 810 m || 
|-id=081 bgcolor=#fefefe
| 314081 ||  || — || February 2, 2005 || Kitt Peak || Spacewatch || NYS || align=right data-sort-value="0.69" | 690 m || 
|-id=082 bgcolor=#FFC2E0
| 314082 Dryope ||  ||  || February 6, 2005 || Uccle || E. W. Elst, H. Debehogne || APO +1kmPHA || align=right | 1.2 km || 
|-id=083 bgcolor=#fefefe
| 314083 ||  || — || February 3, 2005 || Socorro || LINEAR || — || align=right | 1.1 km || 
|-id=084 bgcolor=#fefefe
| 314084 ||  || — || February 2, 2005 || Kitt Peak || Spacewatch || V || align=right data-sort-value="0.83" | 830 m || 
|-id=085 bgcolor=#fefefe
| 314085 ||  || — || February 2, 2005 || Kitt Peak || Spacewatch || — || align=right data-sort-value="0.73" | 730 m || 
|-id=086 bgcolor=#fefefe
| 314086 ||  || — || February 2, 2005 || Socorro || LINEAR || FLO || align=right data-sort-value="0.94" | 940 m || 
|-id=087 bgcolor=#fefefe
| 314087 ||  || — || February 2, 2005 || Catalina || CSS || — || align=right data-sort-value="0.98" | 980 m || 
|-id=088 bgcolor=#fefefe
| 314088 ||  || — || February 4, 2005 || Kitt Peak || Spacewatch || FLO || align=right data-sort-value="0.74" | 740 m || 
|-id=089 bgcolor=#fefefe
| 314089 ||  || — || February 14, 2005 || Mayhill || A. Lowe || NYS || align=right data-sort-value="0.72" | 720 m || 
|-id=090 bgcolor=#fefefe
| 314090 ||  || — || February 9, 2005 || Kitt Peak || Spacewatch || NYS || align=right data-sort-value="0.87" | 870 m || 
|-id=091 bgcolor=#fefefe
| 314091 ||  || — || February 28, 2005 || Goodricke-Pigott || R. A. Tucker || — || align=right data-sort-value="0.98" | 980 m || 
|-id=092 bgcolor=#fefefe
| 314092 ||  || — || March 3, 2005 || Kitt Peak || Spacewatch || — || align=right data-sort-value="0.91" | 910 m || 
|-id=093 bgcolor=#fefefe
| 314093 ||  || — || March 3, 2005 || Kitt Peak || Spacewatch || PHO || align=right | 3.0 km || 
|-id=094 bgcolor=#fefefe
| 314094 ||  || — || March 3, 2005 || Kitt Peak || Spacewatch || NYS || align=right data-sort-value="0.70" | 700 m || 
|-id=095 bgcolor=#fefefe
| 314095 ||  || — || March 3, 2005 || Kitt Peak || Spacewatch || — || align=right data-sort-value="0.89" | 890 m || 
|-id=096 bgcolor=#fefefe
| 314096 ||  || — || September 30, 2003 || Kitt Peak || Spacewatch || V || align=right data-sort-value="0.81" | 810 m || 
|-id=097 bgcolor=#fefefe
| 314097 ||  || — || March 3, 2005 || Catalina || CSS || NYS || align=right data-sort-value="0.69" | 690 m || 
|-id=098 bgcolor=#fefefe
| 314098 ||  || — || March 3, 2005 || Socorro || LINEAR || — || align=right | 1.3 km || 
|-id=099 bgcolor=#fefefe
| 314099 ||  || — || March 3, 2005 || Kitt Peak || Spacewatch || — || align=right data-sort-value="0.91" | 910 m || 
|-id=100 bgcolor=#fefefe
| 314100 ||  || — || March 3, 2005 || Catalina || CSS || NYS || align=right data-sort-value="0.66" | 660 m || 
|}

314101–314200 

|-bgcolor=#fefefe
| 314101 ||  || — || March 4, 2005 || Kitt Peak || Spacewatch || MAS || align=right data-sort-value="0.70" | 700 m || 
|-id=102 bgcolor=#fefefe
| 314102 ||  || — || March 4, 2005 || Kitt Peak || Spacewatch || — || align=right data-sort-value="0.82" | 820 m || 
|-id=103 bgcolor=#fefefe
| 314103 ||  || — || March 3, 2005 || Kitt Peak || Spacewatch || — || align=right | 1.1 km || 
|-id=104 bgcolor=#fefefe
| 314104 ||  || — || March 3, 2005 || Catalina || CSS || — || align=right data-sort-value="0.91" | 910 m || 
|-id=105 bgcolor=#fefefe
| 314105 ||  || — || March 3, 2005 || Catalina || CSS || V || align=right data-sort-value="0.96" | 960 m || 
|-id=106 bgcolor=#d6d6d6
| 314106 ||  || — || March 3, 2005 || Catalina || CSS || 3:2 || align=right | 6.4 km || 
|-id=107 bgcolor=#fefefe
| 314107 ||  || — || March 4, 2005 || Kitt Peak || Spacewatch || — || align=right data-sort-value="0.84" | 840 m || 
|-id=108 bgcolor=#fefefe
| 314108 ||  || — || March 4, 2005 || Socorro || LINEAR || — || align=right | 1.1 km || 
|-id=109 bgcolor=#fefefe
| 314109 ||  || — || March 4, 2005 || Mount Lemmon || Mount Lemmon Survey || ERI || align=right | 1.9 km || 
|-id=110 bgcolor=#fefefe
| 314110 ||  || — || March 8, 2005 || Anderson Mesa || LONEOS || PHO || align=right | 1.3 km || 
|-id=111 bgcolor=#fefefe
| 314111 ||  || — || March 8, 2005 || Socorro || LINEAR || V || align=right data-sort-value="0.75" | 750 m || 
|-id=112 bgcolor=#fefefe
| 314112 ||  || — || March 8, 2005 || Socorro || LINEAR || V || align=right data-sort-value="0.75" | 750 m || 
|-id=113 bgcolor=#fefefe
| 314113 ||  || — || March 8, 2005 || Kitt Peak || Spacewatch || FLO || align=right data-sort-value="0.76" | 760 m || 
|-id=114 bgcolor=#fefefe
| 314114 ||  || — || March 8, 2005 || Anderson Mesa || LONEOS || NYS || align=right data-sort-value="0.80" | 800 m || 
|-id=115 bgcolor=#fefefe
| 314115 ||  || — || March 4, 2005 || Kitt Peak || Spacewatch || — || align=right data-sort-value="0.96" | 960 m || 
|-id=116 bgcolor=#fefefe
| 314116 ||  || — || March 4, 2005 || Kitt Peak || Spacewatch || MAS || align=right data-sort-value="0.73" | 730 m || 
|-id=117 bgcolor=#fefefe
| 314117 ||  || — || March 4, 2005 || Mount Lemmon || Mount Lemmon Survey || FLO || align=right data-sort-value="0.72" | 720 m || 
|-id=118 bgcolor=#fefefe
| 314118 ||  || — || March 8, 2005 || Anderson Mesa || LONEOS || NYS || align=right data-sort-value="0.76" | 760 m || 
|-id=119 bgcolor=#fefefe
| 314119 ||  || — || March 9, 2005 || Mount Lemmon || Mount Lemmon Survey || V || align=right data-sort-value="0.74" | 740 m || 
|-id=120 bgcolor=#fefefe
| 314120 ||  || — || March 9, 2005 || Mount Lemmon || Mount Lemmon Survey || MAS || align=right data-sort-value="0.82" | 820 m || 
|-id=121 bgcolor=#fefefe
| 314121 ||  || — || March 10, 2005 || Mount Lemmon || Mount Lemmon Survey || NYS || align=right data-sort-value="0.60" | 600 m || 
|-id=122 bgcolor=#fefefe
| 314122 ||  || — || March 10, 2005 || Kitt Peak || Spacewatch || NYS || align=right data-sort-value="0.92" | 920 m || 
|-id=123 bgcolor=#fefefe
| 314123 ||  || — || March 10, 2005 || Kitt Peak || Spacewatch || — || align=right data-sort-value="0.95" | 950 m || 
|-id=124 bgcolor=#fefefe
| 314124 ||  || — || March 10, 2005 || Kitt Peak || Spacewatch || MAS || align=right data-sort-value="0.95" | 950 m || 
|-id=125 bgcolor=#fefefe
| 314125 ||  || — || March 8, 2005 || Mount Lemmon || Mount Lemmon Survey || ERI || align=right | 1.8 km || 
|-id=126 bgcolor=#fefefe
| 314126 ||  || — || March 8, 2005 || Mount Lemmon || Mount Lemmon Survey || NYS || align=right data-sort-value="0.61" | 610 m || 
|-id=127 bgcolor=#fefefe
| 314127 ||  || — || March 9, 2005 || Mount Lemmon || Mount Lemmon Survey || MAS || align=right data-sort-value="0.84" | 840 m || 
|-id=128 bgcolor=#fefefe
| 314128 ||  || — || March 9, 2005 || Mount Lemmon || Mount Lemmon Survey || — || align=right data-sort-value="0.94" | 940 m || 
|-id=129 bgcolor=#fefefe
| 314129 ||  || — || March 11, 2005 || Kitt Peak || Spacewatch || ERI || align=right | 1.9 km || 
|-id=130 bgcolor=#fefefe
| 314130 ||  || — || March 11, 2005 || Kitt Peak || Spacewatch || NYS || align=right data-sort-value="0.68" | 680 m || 
|-id=131 bgcolor=#fefefe
| 314131 ||  || — || March 9, 2005 || Kitt Peak || Spacewatch || — || align=right data-sort-value="0.89" | 890 m || 
|-id=132 bgcolor=#fefefe
| 314132 ||  || — || March 9, 2005 || Kitt Peak || Spacewatch || NYS || align=right data-sort-value="0.61" | 610 m || 
|-id=133 bgcolor=#fefefe
| 314133 ||  || — || March 9, 2005 || Mount Lemmon || Mount Lemmon Survey || V || align=right data-sort-value="0.65" | 650 m || 
|-id=134 bgcolor=#fefefe
| 314134 ||  || — || March 9, 2005 || Kitt Peak || Spacewatch || NYS || align=right data-sort-value="0.70" | 700 m || 
|-id=135 bgcolor=#fefefe
| 314135 ||  || — || March 10, 2005 || Mount Lemmon || Mount Lemmon Survey || NYS || align=right data-sort-value="0.68" | 680 m || 
|-id=136 bgcolor=#fefefe
| 314136 ||  || — || March 11, 2005 || Mount Lemmon || Mount Lemmon Survey || V || align=right data-sort-value="0.63" | 630 m || 
|-id=137 bgcolor=#fefefe
| 314137 ||  || — || March 11, 2005 || Mount Lemmon || Mount Lemmon Survey || — || align=right | 1.0 km || 
|-id=138 bgcolor=#fefefe
| 314138 ||  || — || March 11, 2005 || Mount Lemmon || Mount Lemmon Survey || NYS || align=right data-sort-value="0.87" | 870 m || 
|-id=139 bgcolor=#fefefe
| 314139 ||  || — || March 11, 2005 || Mount Lemmon || Mount Lemmon Survey || FLO || align=right data-sort-value="0.67" | 670 m || 
|-id=140 bgcolor=#fefefe
| 314140 ||  || — || March 3, 2005 || Kitt Peak || Spacewatch || NYS || align=right data-sort-value="0.70" | 700 m || 
|-id=141 bgcolor=#fefefe
| 314141 ||  || — || March 11, 2005 || Mount Lemmon || Mount Lemmon Survey || NYS || align=right data-sort-value="0.88" | 880 m || 
|-id=142 bgcolor=#fefefe
| 314142 ||  || — || March 10, 2005 || Mount Lemmon || Mount Lemmon Survey || NYS || align=right data-sort-value="0.84" | 840 m || 
|-id=143 bgcolor=#fefefe
| 314143 ||  || — || March 4, 2005 || Kitt Peak || Spacewatch || — || align=right | 1.3 km || 
|-id=144 bgcolor=#fefefe
| 314144 ||  || — || March 4, 2005 || Kitt Peak || Spacewatch || — || align=right | 1.2 km || 
|-id=145 bgcolor=#fefefe
| 314145 ||  || — || March 4, 2005 || Mount Lemmon || Mount Lemmon Survey || CLA || align=right | 1.5 km || 
|-id=146 bgcolor=#fefefe
| 314146 ||  || — || March 4, 2005 || Socorro || LINEAR || — || align=right | 1.2 km || 
|-id=147 bgcolor=#fefefe
| 314147 ||  || — || March 10, 2005 || Anderson Mesa || LONEOS || — || align=right | 1.1 km || 
|-id=148 bgcolor=#fefefe
| 314148 ||  || — || March 11, 2005 || Mount Lemmon || Mount Lemmon Survey || NYS || align=right data-sort-value="0.68" | 680 m || 
|-id=149 bgcolor=#fefefe
| 314149 ||  || — || March 12, 2005 || Socorro || LINEAR || NYS || align=right data-sort-value="0.97" | 970 m || 
|-id=150 bgcolor=#fefefe
| 314150 ||  || — || March 10, 2005 || Anderson Mesa || LONEOS || — || align=right data-sort-value="0.95" | 950 m || 
|-id=151 bgcolor=#fefefe
| 314151 ||  || — || March 13, 2005 || Kitt Peak || Spacewatch || NYS || align=right data-sort-value="0.67" | 670 m || 
|-id=152 bgcolor=#fefefe
| 314152 ||  || — || March 9, 2005 || Socorro || LINEAR || — || align=right | 1.2 km || 
|-id=153 bgcolor=#fefefe
| 314153 ||  || — || March 3, 2005 || Kitt Peak || Spacewatch || NYS || align=right data-sort-value="0.72" | 720 m || 
|-id=154 bgcolor=#fefefe
| 314154 ||  || — || March 10, 2005 || Anderson Mesa || LONEOS || PHO || align=right | 1.1 km || 
|-id=155 bgcolor=#fefefe
| 314155 ||  || — || March 10, 2005 || Anderson Mesa || LONEOS || FLO || align=right data-sort-value="0.79" | 790 m || 
|-id=156 bgcolor=#fefefe
| 314156 ||  || — || March 10, 2005 || Catalina || CSS || V || align=right data-sort-value="0.92" | 920 m || 
|-id=157 bgcolor=#fefefe
| 314157 ||  || — || March 3, 2005 || Catalina || CSS || — || align=right data-sort-value="0.86" | 860 m || 
|-id=158 bgcolor=#fefefe
| 314158 ||  || — || March 10, 2005 || Mount Lemmon || Mount Lemmon Survey || — || align=right | 1.1 km || 
|-id=159 bgcolor=#fefefe
| 314159 ||  || — || March 16, 2005 || Mount Lemmon || Mount Lemmon Survey || — || align=right data-sort-value="0.78" | 780 m || 
|-id=160 bgcolor=#fefefe
| 314160 ||  || — || March 31, 2005 || Jarnac || Jarnac Obs. || — || align=right data-sort-value="0.87" | 870 m || 
|-id=161 bgcolor=#fefefe
| 314161 ||  || — || March 30, 2005 || Catalina || CSS || — || align=right | 3.0 km || 
|-id=162 bgcolor=#fefefe
| 314162 ||  || — || March 21, 2005 || Junk Bond || Junk Bond Obs. || MAS || align=right data-sort-value="0.90" | 900 m || 
|-id=163 bgcolor=#fefefe
| 314163 Kittenberger || 2005 GX ||  || April 1, 2005 || Piszkéstető || K. Sárneczky || MAS || align=right data-sort-value="0.66" | 660 m || 
|-id=164 bgcolor=#fefefe
| 314164 ||  || — || April 1, 2005 || Anderson Mesa || LONEOS || — || align=right data-sort-value="0.99" | 990 m || 
|-id=165 bgcolor=#d6d6d6
| 314165 ||  || — || April 2, 2005 || Palomar || NEAT || 3:2 || align=right | 5.5 km || 
|-id=166 bgcolor=#fefefe
| 314166 ||  || — || April 2, 2005 || Mount Lemmon || Mount Lemmon Survey || — || align=right data-sort-value="0.85" | 850 m || 
|-id=167 bgcolor=#fefefe
| 314167 ||  || — || April 5, 2005 || Mount Lemmon || Mount Lemmon Survey || NYS || align=right data-sort-value="0.61" | 610 m || 
|-id=168 bgcolor=#fefefe
| 314168 ||  || — || April 5, 2005 || Mount Lemmon || Mount Lemmon Survey || — || align=right data-sort-value="0.80" | 800 m || 
|-id=169 bgcolor=#fefefe
| 314169 ||  || — || April 1, 2005 || Anderson Mesa || LONEOS || — || align=right | 1.3 km || 
|-id=170 bgcolor=#fefefe
| 314170 ||  || — || April 2, 2005 || Mount Lemmon || Mount Lemmon Survey || MAS || align=right data-sort-value="0.65" | 650 m || 
|-id=171 bgcolor=#fefefe
| 314171 ||  || — || April 4, 2005 || Catalina || CSS || — || align=right | 1.2 km || 
|-id=172 bgcolor=#fefefe
| 314172 ||  || — || April 4, 2005 || Catalina || CSS || — || align=right | 1.3 km || 
|-id=173 bgcolor=#fefefe
| 314173 ||  || — || April 5, 2005 || Anderson Mesa || LONEOS || NYS || align=right data-sort-value="0.92" | 920 m || 
|-id=174 bgcolor=#fefefe
| 314174 ||  || — || April 7, 2005 || Mount Lemmon || Mount Lemmon Survey || MAS || align=right data-sort-value="0.76" | 760 m || 
|-id=175 bgcolor=#fefefe
| 314175 ||  || — || April 9, 2005 || Kitt Peak || Spacewatch || PHO || align=right | 1.3 km || 
|-id=176 bgcolor=#d6d6d6
| 314176 ||  || — || April 5, 2005 || Palomar || NEAT || 3:2 || align=right | 11 km || 
|-id=177 bgcolor=#fefefe
| 314177 ||  || — || April 11, 2005 || Anderson Mesa || LONEOS || NYS || align=right data-sort-value="0.88" | 880 m || 
|-id=178 bgcolor=#fefefe
| 314178 ||  || — || April 5, 2005 || Mount Lemmon || Mount Lemmon Survey || — || align=right data-sort-value="0.78" | 780 m || 
|-id=179 bgcolor=#fefefe
| 314179 ||  || — || April 11, 2005 || Anderson Mesa || LONEOS || MAS || align=right data-sort-value="0.91" | 910 m || 
|-id=180 bgcolor=#fefefe
| 314180 ||  || — || April 1, 2005 || Catalina || CSS || PHO || align=right | 1.4 km || 
|-id=181 bgcolor=#d6d6d6
| 314181 ||  || — || April 10, 2005 || Kitt Peak || Spacewatch || 3:2 || align=right | 5.4 km || 
|-id=182 bgcolor=#fefefe
| 314182 ||  || — || April 14, 2005 || Kitt Peak || Spacewatch || — || align=right data-sort-value="0.90" | 900 m || 
|-id=183 bgcolor=#fefefe
| 314183 ||  || — || April 11, 2005 || Mount Lemmon || Mount Lemmon Survey || MAS || align=right data-sort-value="0.73" | 730 m || 
|-id=184 bgcolor=#fefefe
| 314184 ||  || — || April 12, 2005 || Kitt Peak || Spacewatch || — || align=right data-sort-value="0.76" | 760 m || 
|-id=185 bgcolor=#fefefe
| 314185 ||  || — || March 9, 2005 || Mount Lemmon || Mount Lemmon Survey || — || align=right data-sort-value="0.80" | 800 m || 
|-id=186 bgcolor=#fefefe
| 314186 ||  || — || April 12, 2005 || Kitt Peak || Spacewatch || MAS || align=right data-sort-value="0.66" | 660 m || 
|-id=187 bgcolor=#fefefe
| 314187 ||  || — || April 19, 2005 || Catalina || CSS || H || align=right data-sort-value="0.99" | 990 m || 
|-id=188 bgcolor=#fefefe
| 314188 ||  || — || May 4, 2005 || Kitt Peak || Spacewatch || NYS || align=right data-sort-value="0.62" | 620 m || 
|-id=189 bgcolor=#fefefe
| 314189 ||  || — || May 7, 2005 || Catalina || CSS || — || align=right data-sort-value="0.96" | 960 m || 
|-id=190 bgcolor=#E9E9E9
| 314190 ||  || — || May 10, 2005 || Kitt Peak || Spacewatch || — || align=right | 2.7 km || 
|-id=191 bgcolor=#C2FFFF
| 314191 ||  || — || May 10, 2005 || Kitt Peak || Spacewatch || L4 || align=right | 9.9 km || 
|-id=192 bgcolor=#E9E9E9
| 314192 ||  || — || May 11, 2005 || Kitt Peak || Spacewatch || — || align=right | 2.6 km || 
|-id=193 bgcolor=#fefefe
| 314193 ||  || — || May 12, 2005 || Kitt Peak || Spacewatch || V || align=right data-sort-value="0.89" | 890 m || 
|-id=194 bgcolor=#fefefe
| 314194 ||  || — || May 13, 2005 || Mount Lemmon || Mount Lemmon Survey || NYS || align=right data-sort-value="0.82" | 820 m || 
|-id=195 bgcolor=#E9E9E9
| 314195 ||  || — || May 15, 2005 || Mount Lemmon || Mount Lemmon Survey || MAR || align=right | 1.3 km || 
|-id=196 bgcolor=#fefefe
| 314196 ||  || — || May 4, 2005 || Kitt Peak || Spacewatch || V || align=right data-sort-value="0.88" | 880 m || 
|-id=197 bgcolor=#fefefe
| 314197 ||  || — || May 16, 2005 || Kitt Peak || Spacewatch || — || align=right data-sort-value="0.70" | 700 m || 
|-id=198 bgcolor=#fefefe
| 314198 ||  || — || May 17, 2005 || Mount Lemmon || Mount Lemmon Survey || NYS || align=right data-sort-value="0.73" | 730 m || 
|-id=199 bgcolor=#E9E9E9
| 314199 ||  || — || June 1, 2005 || Kitt Peak || Spacewatch || — || align=right | 1.2 km || 
|-id=200 bgcolor=#E9E9E9
| 314200 ||  || — || June 4, 2005 || Kitt Peak || Spacewatch || — || align=right | 2.3 km || 
|}

314201–314300 

|-bgcolor=#E9E9E9
| 314201 ||  || — || June 4, 2005 || Kitt Peak || Spacewatch || — || align=right | 2.2 km || 
|-id=202 bgcolor=#E9E9E9
| 314202 ||  || — || June 8, 2005 || Kitt Peak || Spacewatch || EUN || align=right | 1.6 km || 
|-id=203 bgcolor=#E9E9E9
| 314203 ||  || — || June 9, 2005 || Kitt Peak || Spacewatch || EUN || align=right | 1.4 km || 
|-id=204 bgcolor=#E9E9E9
| 314204 ||  || — || June 13, 2005 || Kitt Peak || Spacewatch || EUN || align=right | 1.3 km || 
|-id=205 bgcolor=#E9E9E9
| 314205 ||  || — || June 15, 2005 || Mount Lemmon || Mount Lemmon Survey || — || align=right | 2.7 km || 
|-id=206 bgcolor=#E9E9E9
| 314206 ||  || — || June 29, 2005 || Palomar || NEAT || — || align=right | 2.6 km || 
|-id=207 bgcolor=#E9E9E9
| 314207 ||  || — || June 30, 2005 || Kitt Peak || Spacewatch || — || align=right | 2.3 km || 
|-id=208 bgcolor=#fefefe
| 314208 ||  || — || June 30, 2005 || Kitt Peak || Spacewatch || — || align=right data-sort-value="0.94" | 940 m || 
|-id=209 bgcolor=#E9E9E9
| 314209 ||  || — || June 30, 2005 || Palomar || NEAT || JUN || align=right | 1.5 km || 
|-id=210 bgcolor=#E9E9E9
| 314210 ||  || — || June 30, 2005 || Palomar || NEAT || EUN || align=right | 1.4 km || 
|-id=211 bgcolor=#fefefe
| 314211 ||  || — || June 23, 2005 || Palomar || NEAT || H || align=right data-sort-value="0.96" | 960 m || 
|-id=212 bgcolor=#FFC2E0
| 314212 ||  || — || July 2, 2005 || Catalina || CSS || APOPHAcritical || align=right data-sort-value="0.71" | 710 m || 
|-id=213 bgcolor=#E9E9E9
| 314213 ||  || — || July 3, 2005 || Mount Lemmon || Mount Lemmon Survey || — || align=right | 1.7 km || 
|-id=214 bgcolor=#E9E9E9
| 314214 ||  || — || July 2, 2005 || Kitt Peak || Spacewatch || — || align=right | 1.0 km || 
|-id=215 bgcolor=#E9E9E9
| 314215 ||  || — || July 6, 2005 || Kitt Peak || Spacewatch || — || align=right | 1.2 km || 
|-id=216 bgcolor=#E9E9E9
| 314216 ||  || — || July 11, 2005 || Kitt Peak || Spacewatch || — || align=right | 1.2 km || 
|-id=217 bgcolor=#E9E9E9
| 314217 ||  || — || July 11, 2005 || Kitt Peak || Spacewatch || — || align=right | 2.3 km || 
|-id=218 bgcolor=#E9E9E9
| 314218 ||  || — || June 15, 2005 || Mount Lemmon || Mount Lemmon Survey || — || align=right | 1.9 km || 
|-id=219 bgcolor=#E9E9E9
| 314219 ||  || — || July 7, 2005 || Kitt Peak || Spacewatch || — || align=right | 1.7 km || 
|-id=220 bgcolor=#E9E9E9
| 314220 ||  || — || July 15, 2005 || Mount Lemmon || Mount Lemmon Survey || — || align=right | 1.4 km || 
|-id=221 bgcolor=#E9E9E9
| 314221 ||  || — || July 2, 2005 || Catalina || CSS || — || align=right | 2.6 km || 
|-id=222 bgcolor=#E9E9E9
| 314222 ||  || — || July 12, 2005 || Mount Lemmon || Mount Lemmon Survey || ADE || align=right | 4.0 km || 
|-id=223 bgcolor=#E9E9E9
| 314223 ||  || — || July 11, 2005 || Mount Lemmon || Mount Lemmon Survey || — || align=right | 2.8 km || 
|-id=224 bgcolor=#E9E9E9
| 314224 ||  || — || July 17, 2005 || Palomar || NEAT || MAR || align=right | 1.2 km || 
|-id=225 bgcolor=#E9E9E9
| 314225 ||  || — || July 28, 2005 || Palomar || NEAT || EUN || align=right | 1.7 km || 
|-id=226 bgcolor=#E9E9E9
| 314226 ||  || — || July 27, 2005 || Palomar || NEAT || — || align=right | 1.5 km || 
|-id=227 bgcolor=#fefefe
| 314227 ||  || — || July 27, 2005 || Palomar || NEAT || H || align=right data-sort-value="0.74" | 740 m || 
|-id=228 bgcolor=#E9E9E9
| 314228 ||  || — || July 29, 2005 || Socorro || LINEAR || GAL || align=right | 2.4 km || 
|-id=229 bgcolor=#E9E9E9
| 314229 ||  || — || July 30, 2005 || Palomar || NEAT || — || align=right | 1.4 km || 
|-id=230 bgcolor=#E9E9E9
| 314230 ||  || — || August 1, 2005 || Siding Spring || SSS || — || align=right | 2.2 km || 
|-id=231 bgcolor=#d6d6d6
| 314231 ||  || — || August 6, 2005 || Reedy Creek || J. Broughton || — || align=right | 2.1 km || 
|-id=232 bgcolor=#d6d6d6
| 314232 ||  || — || August 4, 2005 || Palomar || NEAT || — || align=right | 2.6 km || 
|-id=233 bgcolor=#E9E9E9
| 314233 ||  || — || August 4, 2005 || Palomar || NEAT || EUN || align=right | 1.3 km || 
|-id=234 bgcolor=#E9E9E9
| 314234 ||  || — || August 24, 2005 || Palomar || NEAT || — || align=right | 3.2 km || 
|-id=235 bgcolor=#E9E9E9
| 314235 ||  || — || August 25, 2005 || Palomar || NEAT || — || align=right | 3.2 km || 
|-id=236 bgcolor=#E9E9E9
| 314236 ||  || — || August 27, 2005 || Kitt Peak || Spacewatch || — || align=right | 2.2 km || 
|-id=237 bgcolor=#E9E9E9
| 314237 ||  || — || August 27, 2005 || Anderson Mesa || LONEOS || — || align=right | 2.9 km || 
|-id=238 bgcolor=#E9E9E9
| 314238 ||  || — || August 27, 2005 || Kitt Peak || Spacewatch || AGN || align=right | 1.6 km || 
|-id=239 bgcolor=#E9E9E9
| 314239 ||  || — || August 26, 2005 || Palomar || NEAT || — || align=right | 2.2 km || 
|-id=240 bgcolor=#d6d6d6
| 314240 ||  || — || August 26, 2005 || Palomar || NEAT || KOR || align=right | 2.1 km || 
|-id=241 bgcolor=#E9E9E9
| 314241 ||  || — || August 28, 2005 || Kitt Peak || Spacewatch || — || align=right | 2.0 km || 
|-id=242 bgcolor=#d6d6d6
| 314242 ||  || — || August 28, 2005 || Kitt Peak || Spacewatch || KOR || align=right | 1.4 km || 
|-id=243 bgcolor=#d6d6d6
| 314243 ||  || — || August 25, 2005 || Palomar || NEAT || — || align=right | 2.4 km || 
|-id=244 bgcolor=#d6d6d6
| 314244 ||  || — || August 26, 2005 || Palomar || NEAT || CHA || align=right | 2.5 km || 
|-id=245 bgcolor=#E9E9E9
| 314245 ||  || — || August 24, 2005 || Palomar || NEAT || — || align=right | 3.1 km || 
|-id=246 bgcolor=#E9E9E9
| 314246 ||  || — || August 25, 2005 || Palomar || NEAT || — || align=right | 2.0 km || 
|-id=247 bgcolor=#E9E9E9
| 314247 ||  || — || August 31, 2005 || Drebach || J. Kandler || AGN || align=right | 1.4 km || 
|-id=248 bgcolor=#E9E9E9
| 314248 ||  || — || August 26, 2005 || Palomar || NEAT || MRX || align=right | 1.5 km || 
|-id=249 bgcolor=#E9E9E9
| 314249 ||  || — || August 27, 2005 || Palomar || NEAT || — || align=right | 2.9 km || 
|-id=250 bgcolor=#E9E9E9
| 314250 ||  || — || July 6, 2005 || Kitt Peak || Spacewatch || — || align=right | 2.3 km || 
|-id=251 bgcolor=#E9E9E9
| 314251 ||  || — || August 27, 2005 || Palomar || NEAT || — || align=right | 2.2 km || 
|-id=252 bgcolor=#E9E9E9
| 314252 ||  || — || August 27, 2005 || Palomar || NEAT || — || align=right | 3.2 km || 
|-id=253 bgcolor=#d6d6d6
| 314253 ||  || — || August 27, 2005 || Palomar || NEAT || — || align=right | 2.6 km || 
|-id=254 bgcolor=#E9E9E9
| 314254 ||  || — || August 27, 2005 || Palomar || NEAT || HOF || align=right | 2.9 km || 
|-id=255 bgcolor=#E9E9E9
| 314255 ||  || — || August 28, 2005 || Kitt Peak || Spacewatch || — || align=right | 1.7 km || 
|-id=256 bgcolor=#E9E9E9
| 314256 ||  || — || August 28, 2005 || Kitt Peak || Spacewatch || HOF || align=right | 2.6 km || 
|-id=257 bgcolor=#E9E9E9
| 314257 ||  || — || August 28, 2005 || Kitt Peak || Spacewatch || — || align=right | 2.3 km || 
|-id=258 bgcolor=#E9E9E9
| 314258 ||  || — || August 28, 2005 || Kitt Peak || Spacewatch || — || align=right | 1.8 km || 
|-id=259 bgcolor=#E9E9E9
| 314259 ||  || — || August 28, 2005 || Kitt Peak || Spacewatch || — || align=right | 1.6 km || 
|-id=260 bgcolor=#E9E9E9
| 314260 ||  || — || August 28, 2005 || Kitt Peak || Spacewatch || — || align=right | 2.8 km || 
|-id=261 bgcolor=#E9E9E9
| 314261 ||  || — || August 27, 2005 || Anderson Mesa || LONEOS || CLO || align=right | 3.0 km || 
|-id=262 bgcolor=#E9E9E9
| 314262 ||  || — || August 28, 2005 || Siding Spring || SSS || — || align=right | 1.8 km || 
|-id=263 bgcolor=#E9E9E9
| 314263 ||  || — || August 27, 2005 || Palomar || NEAT || GEF || align=right | 1.8 km || 
|-id=264 bgcolor=#E9E9E9
| 314264 ||  || — || July 28, 2005 || Palomar || NEAT || — || align=right | 2.8 km || 
|-id=265 bgcolor=#E9E9E9
| 314265 ||  || — || August 26, 2005 || Palomar || NEAT || — || align=right | 1.4 km || 
|-id=266 bgcolor=#E9E9E9
| 314266 ||  || — || August 26, 2005 || Palomar || NEAT || — || align=right | 2.3 km || 
|-id=267 bgcolor=#d6d6d6
| 314267 ||  || — || August 29, 2005 || Kitt Peak || Spacewatch || CHA || align=right | 2.1 km || 
|-id=268 bgcolor=#E9E9E9
| 314268 ||  || — || August 31, 2005 || Kitt Peak || Spacewatch || — || align=right | 2.9 km || 
|-id=269 bgcolor=#d6d6d6
| 314269 ||  || — || September 2, 2005 || Palomar || NEAT || Tj (2.94) || align=right | 4.4 km || 
|-id=270 bgcolor=#E9E9E9
| 314270 ||  || — || September 1, 2005 || Anderson Mesa || LONEOS || — || align=right | 1.9 km || 
|-id=271 bgcolor=#E9E9E9
| 314271 ||  || — || September 12, 2005 || Junk Bond || D. Healy || — || align=right | 2.3 km || 
|-id=272 bgcolor=#E9E9E9
| 314272 ||  || — || September 11, 2005 || Kitt Peak || Spacewatch || — || align=right | 2.9 km || 
|-id=273 bgcolor=#fefefe
| 314273 ||  || — || September 14, 2005 || Catalina || CSS || H || align=right data-sort-value="0.92" | 920 m || 
|-id=274 bgcolor=#E9E9E9
| 314274 ||  || — || September 11, 2005 || Kitt Peak || Spacewatch || WIT || align=right | 1.2 km || 
|-id=275 bgcolor=#E9E9E9
| 314275 ||  || — || September 26, 2005 || Kitt Peak || Spacewatch || — || align=right | 2.7 km || 
|-id=276 bgcolor=#E9E9E9
| 314276 ||  || — || September 23, 2005 || Kitt Peak || Spacewatch || — || align=right | 3.7 km || 
|-id=277 bgcolor=#d6d6d6
| 314277 ||  || — || September 23, 2005 || Catalina || CSS || — || align=right | 3.2 km || 
|-id=278 bgcolor=#fefefe
| 314278 ||  || — || September 23, 2005 || Catalina || CSS || H || align=right data-sort-value="0.89" | 890 m || 
|-id=279 bgcolor=#d6d6d6
| 314279 ||  || — || September 23, 2005 || Kitt Peak || Spacewatch || — || align=right | 2.6 km || 
|-id=280 bgcolor=#d6d6d6
| 314280 ||  || — || September 23, 2005 || Kitt Peak || Spacewatch || — || align=right | 2.0 km || 
|-id=281 bgcolor=#d6d6d6
| 314281 ||  || — || September 23, 2005 || Kitt Peak || Spacewatch || — || align=right | 2.5 km || 
|-id=282 bgcolor=#d6d6d6
| 314282 ||  || — || September 24, 2005 || Kitt Peak || Spacewatch || KOR || align=right | 1.4 km || 
|-id=283 bgcolor=#E9E9E9
| 314283 ||  || — || September 24, 2005 || Kitt Peak || Spacewatch || HOF || align=right | 2.8 km || 
|-id=284 bgcolor=#E9E9E9
| 314284 ||  || — || September 24, 2005 || Kitt Peak || Spacewatch || HOF || align=right | 2.8 km || 
|-id=285 bgcolor=#E9E9E9
| 314285 ||  || — || September 25, 2005 || Kitt Peak || Spacewatch || — || align=right | 2.5 km || 
|-id=286 bgcolor=#d6d6d6
| 314286 ||  || — || September 26, 2005 || Kitt Peak || Spacewatch || — || align=right | 2.8 km || 
|-id=287 bgcolor=#d6d6d6
| 314287 ||  || — || September 26, 2005 || Palomar || NEAT || CHA || align=right | 2.6 km || 
|-id=288 bgcolor=#E9E9E9
| 314288 ||  || — || September 27, 2005 || Kitt Peak || Spacewatch || — || align=right | 1.2 km || 
|-id=289 bgcolor=#d6d6d6
| 314289 ||  || — || September 27, 2005 || Kitt Peak || Spacewatch || — || align=right | 2.8 km || 
|-id=290 bgcolor=#E9E9E9
| 314290 ||  || — || September 23, 2005 || Anderson Mesa || LONEOS || — || align=right | 3.8 km || 
|-id=291 bgcolor=#d6d6d6
| 314291 ||  || — || September 24, 2005 || Kitt Peak || Spacewatch || KAR || align=right | 1.1 km || 
|-id=292 bgcolor=#d6d6d6
| 314292 ||  || — || September 24, 2005 || Kitt Peak || Spacewatch || KOR || align=right | 1.2 km || 
|-id=293 bgcolor=#E9E9E9
| 314293 ||  || — || September 24, 2005 || Kitt Peak || Spacewatch || HOF || align=right | 3.3 km || 
|-id=294 bgcolor=#d6d6d6
| 314294 ||  || — || September 24, 2005 || Kitt Peak || Spacewatch || KOR || align=right | 1.1 km || 
|-id=295 bgcolor=#E9E9E9
| 314295 ||  || — || September 25, 2005 || Kitt Peak || Spacewatch || — || align=right | 2.6 km || 
|-id=296 bgcolor=#d6d6d6
| 314296 ||  || — || September 25, 2005 || Palomar || NEAT || HYG || align=right | 2.8 km || 
|-id=297 bgcolor=#d6d6d6
| 314297 ||  || — || September 25, 2005 || Palomar || NEAT || FIR || align=right | 4.1 km || 
|-id=298 bgcolor=#E9E9E9
| 314298 ||  || — || September 25, 2005 || Kitt Peak || Spacewatch || — || align=right | 1.8 km || 
|-id=299 bgcolor=#d6d6d6
| 314299 ||  || — || September 25, 2005 || Kitt Peak || Spacewatch || — || align=right | 2.4 km || 
|-id=300 bgcolor=#d6d6d6
| 314300 ||  || — || September 25, 2005 || Kitt Peak || Spacewatch || — || align=right | 2.4 km || 
|}

314301–314400 

|-bgcolor=#d6d6d6
| 314301 ||  || — || September 26, 2005 || Kitt Peak || Spacewatch || — || align=right | 2.2 km || 
|-id=302 bgcolor=#E9E9E9
| 314302 ||  || — || September 27, 2005 || Kitt Peak || Spacewatch || NEM || align=right | 2.7 km || 
|-id=303 bgcolor=#E9E9E9
| 314303 ||  || — || September 29, 2005 || Kitt Peak || Spacewatch || HEN || align=right | 1.3 km || 
|-id=304 bgcolor=#fefefe
| 314304 ||  || — || September 23, 2005 || Catalina || CSS || H || align=right data-sort-value="0.79" | 790 m || 
|-id=305 bgcolor=#E9E9E9
| 314305 ||  || — || September 24, 2005 || Kitt Peak || Spacewatch || — || align=right | 2.9 km || 
|-id=306 bgcolor=#d6d6d6
| 314306 ||  || — || September 25, 2005 || Kitt Peak || Spacewatch || — || align=right | 1.8 km || 
|-id=307 bgcolor=#d6d6d6
| 314307 ||  || — || September 25, 2005 || Kitt Peak || Spacewatch || — || align=right | 3.4 km || 
|-id=308 bgcolor=#E9E9E9
| 314308 ||  || — || September 25, 2005 || Kitt Peak || Spacewatch || — || align=right | 2.7 km || 
|-id=309 bgcolor=#E9E9E9
| 314309 ||  || — || September 27, 2005 || Kitt Peak || Spacewatch || AGN || align=right | 1.2 km || 
|-id=310 bgcolor=#E9E9E9
| 314310 ||  || — || September 29, 2005 || Palomar || NEAT || — || align=right | 3.6 km || 
|-id=311 bgcolor=#E9E9E9
| 314311 ||  || — || September 29, 2005 || Kitt Peak || Spacewatch || — || align=right | 2.0 km || 
|-id=312 bgcolor=#E9E9E9
| 314312 ||  || — || September 29, 2005 || Kitt Peak || Spacewatch || — || align=right | 2.4 km || 
|-id=313 bgcolor=#d6d6d6
| 314313 ||  || — || September 29, 2005 || Mount Lemmon || Mount Lemmon Survey || THM || align=right | 2.0 km || 
|-id=314 bgcolor=#d6d6d6
| 314314 ||  || — || September 29, 2005 || Mount Lemmon || Mount Lemmon Survey || — || align=right | 2.3 km || 
|-id=315 bgcolor=#d6d6d6
| 314315 ||  || — || September 29, 2005 || Anderson Mesa || LONEOS || — || align=right | 3.2 km || 
|-id=316 bgcolor=#d6d6d6
| 314316 ||  || — || September 29, 2005 || Kitt Peak || Spacewatch || — || align=right | 3.5 km || 
|-id=317 bgcolor=#d6d6d6
| 314317 ||  || — || September 30, 2005 || Kitt Peak || Spacewatch || KOR || align=right | 1.3 km || 
|-id=318 bgcolor=#fefefe
| 314318 ||  || — || September 30, 2005 || Anderson Mesa || LONEOS || H || align=right data-sort-value="0.78" | 780 m || 
|-id=319 bgcolor=#fefefe
| 314319 ||  || — || September 30, 2005 || Palomar || NEAT || H || align=right data-sort-value="0.79" | 790 m || 
|-id=320 bgcolor=#d6d6d6
| 314320 ||  || — || September 30, 2005 || Mount Lemmon || Mount Lemmon Survey || — || align=right | 2.6 km || 
|-id=321 bgcolor=#E9E9E9
| 314321 ||  || — || September 30, 2005 || Kitt Peak || Spacewatch || HOF || align=right | 2.5 km || 
|-id=322 bgcolor=#E9E9E9
| 314322 ||  || — || September 23, 2005 || Catalina || CSS || — || align=right | 2.8 km || 
|-id=323 bgcolor=#d6d6d6
| 314323 ||  || — || September 30, 2005 || Mount Lemmon || Mount Lemmon Survey || — || align=right | 3.3 km || 
|-id=324 bgcolor=#d6d6d6
| 314324 ||  || — || September 29, 2005 || Kitt Peak || Spacewatch || — || align=right | 3.4 km || 
|-id=325 bgcolor=#d6d6d6
| 314325 ||  || — || September 30, 2005 || Mauna Kea || Mauna Kea Obs. || — || align=right | 5.2 km || 
|-id=326 bgcolor=#d6d6d6
| 314326 ||  || — || September 13, 2005 || Apache Point || A. C. Becker || — || align=right | 2.9 km || 
|-id=327 bgcolor=#E9E9E9
| 314327 ||  || — || September 28, 2005 || Palomar || NEAT || — || align=right | 2.4 km || 
|-id=328 bgcolor=#E9E9E9
| 314328 ||  || — || October 1, 2005 || Anderson Mesa || LONEOS || — || align=right | 3.5 km || 
|-id=329 bgcolor=#E9E9E9
| 314329 ||  || — || October 1, 2005 || Kitt Peak || Spacewatch || AEO || align=right | 1.3 km || 
|-id=330 bgcolor=#E9E9E9
| 314330 ||  || — || October 1, 2005 || Kitt Peak || Spacewatch || — || align=right | 3.1 km || 
|-id=331 bgcolor=#d6d6d6
| 314331 ||  || — || October 1, 2005 || Mount Lemmon || Mount Lemmon Survey || — || align=right | 3.6 km || 
|-id=332 bgcolor=#E9E9E9
| 314332 ||  || — || October 1, 2005 || Mount Lemmon || Mount Lemmon Survey || GEF || align=right | 1.2 km || 
|-id=333 bgcolor=#E9E9E9
| 314333 ||  || — || October 1, 2005 || Catalina || CSS || — || align=right | 2.4 km || 
|-id=334 bgcolor=#E9E9E9
| 314334 ||  || — || October 1, 2005 || Catalina || CSS || HOF || align=right | 4.4 km || 
|-id=335 bgcolor=#d6d6d6
| 314335 ||  || — || October 1, 2005 || Kitt Peak || Spacewatch || 7:4* || align=right | 3.1 km || 
|-id=336 bgcolor=#E9E9E9
| 314336 ||  || — || October 1, 2005 || Mount Lemmon || Mount Lemmon Survey || HOF || align=right | 2.3 km || 
|-id=337 bgcolor=#E9E9E9
| 314337 ||  || — || October 9, 2005 || Goodricke-Pigott || R. A. Tucker || — || align=right | 2.4 km || 
|-id=338 bgcolor=#d6d6d6
| 314338 ||  || — || October 11, 2005 || Bergisch Gladbach || W. Bickel || — || align=right | 3.9 km || 
|-id=339 bgcolor=#E9E9E9
| 314339 ||  || — || October 1, 2005 || Mount Lemmon || Mount Lemmon Survey || AGN || align=right | 1.5 km || 
|-id=340 bgcolor=#d6d6d6
| 314340 ||  || — || October 6, 2005 || Mount Lemmon || Mount Lemmon Survey || KOR || align=right | 1.4 km || 
|-id=341 bgcolor=#FA8072
| 314341 ||  || — || October 3, 2005 || Catalina || CSS || H || align=right | 1.1 km || 
|-id=342 bgcolor=#d6d6d6
| 314342 ||  || — || October 1, 2005 || Catalina || CSS || — || align=right | 2.5 km || 
|-id=343 bgcolor=#E9E9E9
| 314343 ||  || — || October 3, 2005 || Kitt Peak || Spacewatch || — || align=right | 2.6 km || 
|-id=344 bgcolor=#d6d6d6
| 314344 ||  || — || October 5, 2005 || Kitt Peak || Spacewatch || — || align=right | 2.7 km || 
|-id=345 bgcolor=#E9E9E9
| 314345 ||  || — || October 5, 2005 || Mount Lemmon || Mount Lemmon Survey || — || align=right | 2.5 km || 
|-id=346 bgcolor=#d6d6d6
| 314346 ||  || — || October 7, 2005 || Kitt Peak || Spacewatch || — || align=right | 2.0 km || 
|-id=347 bgcolor=#d6d6d6
| 314347 ||  || — || October 7, 2005 || Kitt Peak || Spacewatch || CHA || align=right | 2.0 km || 
|-id=348 bgcolor=#E9E9E9
| 314348 ||  || — || October 7, 2005 || Kitt Peak || Spacewatch || AGN || align=right | 1.3 km || 
|-id=349 bgcolor=#d6d6d6
| 314349 ||  || — || September 26, 2005 || Kitt Peak || Spacewatch || — || align=right | 2.4 km || 
|-id=350 bgcolor=#d6d6d6
| 314350 ||  || — || October 7, 2005 || Kitt Peak || Spacewatch || K-2 || align=right | 1.3 km || 
|-id=351 bgcolor=#d6d6d6
| 314351 ||  || — || October 7, 2005 || Kitt Peak || Spacewatch || KOR || align=right | 1.3 km || 
|-id=352 bgcolor=#d6d6d6
| 314352 ||  || — || October 7, 2005 || Kitt Peak || Spacewatch || KOR || align=right | 1.7 km || 
|-id=353 bgcolor=#d6d6d6
| 314353 ||  || — || October 10, 2005 || Catalina || CSS || — || align=right | 3.7 km || 
|-id=354 bgcolor=#d6d6d6
| 314354 ||  || — || October 6, 2005 || Kitt Peak || Spacewatch || — || align=right | 3.5 km || 
|-id=355 bgcolor=#E9E9E9
| 314355 ||  || — || October 9, 2005 || Kitt Peak || Spacewatch || — || align=right | 2.2 km || 
|-id=356 bgcolor=#d6d6d6
| 314356 ||  || — || October 9, 2005 || Kitt Peak || Spacewatch || 615 || align=right | 1.9 km || 
|-id=357 bgcolor=#d6d6d6
| 314357 ||  || — || October 9, 2005 || Kitt Peak || Spacewatch || CHA || align=right | 2.8 km || 
|-id=358 bgcolor=#d6d6d6
| 314358 ||  || — || October 9, 2005 || Kitt Peak || Spacewatch || — || align=right | 4.4 km || 
|-id=359 bgcolor=#d6d6d6
| 314359 ||  || — || October 1, 2005 || Kitt Peak || Spacewatch || — || align=right | 2.5 km || 
|-id=360 bgcolor=#d6d6d6
| 314360 ||  || — || October 1, 2005 || Kitt Peak || Spacewatch || — || align=right | 2.2 km || 
|-id=361 bgcolor=#d6d6d6
| 314361 ||  || — || October 1, 2005 || Catalina || CSS || — || align=right | 4.5 km || 
|-id=362 bgcolor=#d6d6d6
| 314362 ||  || — || October 25, 2005 || Socorro || LINEAR || EUP || align=right | 5.1 km || 
|-id=363 bgcolor=#fefefe
| 314363 ||  || — || October 25, 2005 || Socorro || LINEAR || H || align=right data-sort-value="0.87" | 870 m || 
|-id=364 bgcolor=#d6d6d6
| 314364 ||  || — || October 24, 2005 || Kitt Peak || Spacewatch || — || align=right | 2.5 km || 
|-id=365 bgcolor=#d6d6d6
| 314365 ||  || — || October 24, 2005 || Kitt Peak || Spacewatch || 628 || align=right | 2.2 km || 
|-id=366 bgcolor=#d6d6d6
| 314366 ||  || — || October 24, 2005 || Kitt Peak || Spacewatch || KOR || align=right | 1.4 km || 
|-id=367 bgcolor=#d6d6d6
| 314367 ||  || — || October 24, 2005 || Kitt Peak || Spacewatch || — || align=right | 2.5 km || 
|-id=368 bgcolor=#d6d6d6
| 314368 ||  || — || October 24, 2005 || Kitt Peak || Spacewatch || — || align=right | 2.6 km || 
|-id=369 bgcolor=#d6d6d6
| 314369 ||  || — || October 24, 2005 || Kitt Peak || Spacewatch || THM || align=right | 2.7 km || 
|-id=370 bgcolor=#d6d6d6
| 314370 ||  || — || October 24, 2005 || Kitt Peak || Spacewatch || — || align=right | 2.9 km || 
|-id=371 bgcolor=#E9E9E9
| 314371 ||  || — || October 22, 2005 || Kitt Peak || Spacewatch || — || align=right | 2.1 km || 
|-id=372 bgcolor=#d6d6d6
| 314372 ||  || — || October 22, 2005 || Kitt Peak || Spacewatch || EUP || align=right | 4.3 km || 
|-id=373 bgcolor=#d6d6d6
| 314373 ||  || — || October 22, 2005 || Catalina || CSS || — || align=right | 4.1 km || 
|-id=374 bgcolor=#d6d6d6
| 314374 ||  || — || October 23, 2005 || Catalina || CSS || — || align=right | 2.8 km || 
|-id=375 bgcolor=#d6d6d6
| 314375 ||  || — || October 22, 2005 || Kitt Peak || Spacewatch || — || align=right | 4.0 km || 
|-id=376 bgcolor=#d6d6d6
| 314376 ||  || — || October 23, 2005 || Catalina || CSS || — || align=right | 4.2 km || 
|-id=377 bgcolor=#E9E9E9
| 314377 ||  || — || October 23, 2005 || Catalina || CSS || — || align=right | 3.8 km || 
|-id=378 bgcolor=#d6d6d6
| 314378 ||  || — || October 24, 2005 || Palomar || NEAT || — || align=right | 2.6 km || 
|-id=379 bgcolor=#d6d6d6
| 314379 ||  || — || October 25, 2005 || Anderson Mesa || LONEOS || — || align=right | 4.0 km || 
|-id=380 bgcolor=#d6d6d6
| 314380 ||  || — || October 22, 2005 || Kitt Peak || Spacewatch || KOR || align=right | 1.6 km || 
|-id=381 bgcolor=#d6d6d6
| 314381 ||  || — || October 22, 2005 || Kitt Peak || Spacewatch || — || align=right | 3.4 km || 
|-id=382 bgcolor=#d6d6d6
| 314382 ||  || — || October 22, 2005 || Kitt Peak || Spacewatch || — || align=right | 2.9 km || 
|-id=383 bgcolor=#d6d6d6
| 314383 ||  || — || October 22, 2005 || Kitt Peak || Spacewatch || — || align=right | 2.4 km || 
|-id=384 bgcolor=#d6d6d6
| 314384 ||  || — || October 22, 2005 || Kitt Peak || Spacewatch || — || align=right | 2.3 km || 
|-id=385 bgcolor=#d6d6d6
| 314385 ||  || — || October 22, 2005 || Kitt Peak || Spacewatch || TIR || align=right | 2.7 km || 
|-id=386 bgcolor=#d6d6d6
| 314386 ||  || — || October 22, 2005 || Kitt Peak || Spacewatch || — || align=right | 2.7 km || 
|-id=387 bgcolor=#d6d6d6
| 314387 ||  || — || October 22, 2005 || Kitt Peak || Spacewatch || — || align=right | 1.8 km || 
|-id=388 bgcolor=#d6d6d6
| 314388 ||  || — || October 22, 2005 || Palomar || NEAT || — || align=right | 5.5 km || 
|-id=389 bgcolor=#d6d6d6
| 314389 ||  || — || October 25, 2005 || Kitt Peak || Spacewatch || KAR || align=right | 1.2 km || 
|-id=390 bgcolor=#d6d6d6
| 314390 ||  || — || October 25, 2005 || Kitt Peak || Spacewatch || — || align=right | 2.7 km || 
|-id=391 bgcolor=#d6d6d6
| 314391 ||  || — || October 21, 2005 || Palomar || NEAT || — || align=right | 3.1 km || 
|-id=392 bgcolor=#d6d6d6
| 314392 ||  || — || October 25, 2005 || Kitt Peak || Spacewatch || — || align=right | 2.8 km || 
|-id=393 bgcolor=#d6d6d6
| 314393 ||  || — || October 24, 2005 || Kitt Peak || Spacewatch || — || align=right | 2.5 km || 
|-id=394 bgcolor=#d6d6d6
| 314394 ||  || — || October 24, 2005 || Kitt Peak || Spacewatch || — || align=right | 2.6 km || 
|-id=395 bgcolor=#d6d6d6
| 314395 ||  || — || October 24, 2005 || Kitt Peak || Spacewatch || KOR || align=right | 1.6 km || 
|-id=396 bgcolor=#d6d6d6
| 314396 ||  || — || October 27, 2005 || Mount Lemmon || Mount Lemmon Survey || — || align=right | 2.4 km || 
|-id=397 bgcolor=#d6d6d6
| 314397 ||  || — || October 25, 2005 || Kitt Peak || Spacewatch || THM || align=right | 2.0 km || 
|-id=398 bgcolor=#d6d6d6
| 314398 ||  || — || October 25, 2005 || Kitt Peak || Spacewatch || — || align=right | 2.4 km || 
|-id=399 bgcolor=#d6d6d6
| 314399 ||  || — || October 26, 2005 || Kitt Peak || Spacewatch || — || align=right | 2.4 km || 
|-id=400 bgcolor=#d6d6d6
| 314400 ||  || — || October 27, 2005 || Kitt Peak || Spacewatch || KOR || align=right | 1.3 km || 
|}

314401–314500 

|-bgcolor=#d6d6d6
| 314401 ||  || — || October 25, 2005 || Kitt Peak || Spacewatch || — || align=right | 2.4 km || 
|-id=402 bgcolor=#E9E9E9
| 314402 ||  || — || October 25, 2005 || Kitt Peak || Spacewatch || AGN || align=right | 1.5 km || 
|-id=403 bgcolor=#d6d6d6
| 314403 ||  || — || October 25, 2005 || Kitt Peak || Spacewatch || — || align=right | 3.0 km || 
|-id=404 bgcolor=#d6d6d6
| 314404 ||  || — || October 23, 2005 || Catalina || CSS || TIR || align=right | 3.1 km || 
|-id=405 bgcolor=#d6d6d6
| 314405 ||  || — || October 26, 2005 || Kitt Peak || Spacewatch || — || align=right | 3.1 km || 
|-id=406 bgcolor=#d6d6d6
| 314406 ||  || — || October 27, 2005 || Mount Lemmon || Mount Lemmon Survey || EOS || align=right | 3.2 km || 
|-id=407 bgcolor=#d6d6d6
| 314407 ||  || — || September 30, 2005 || Mount Lemmon || Mount Lemmon Survey || — || align=right | 2.2 km || 
|-id=408 bgcolor=#d6d6d6
| 314408 ||  || — || October 26, 2005 || Kitt Peak || Spacewatch || — || align=right | 2.2 km || 
|-id=409 bgcolor=#d6d6d6
| 314409 ||  || — || October 26, 2005 || Kitt Peak || Spacewatch || EOS || align=right | 1.8 km || 
|-id=410 bgcolor=#d6d6d6
| 314410 ||  || — || October 29, 2005 || Catalina || CSS || — || align=right | 4.2 km || 
|-id=411 bgcolor=#d6d6d6
| 314411 ||  || — || October 29, 2005 || Catalina || CSS || EMA || align=right | 5.4 km || 
|-id=412 bgcolor=#d6d6d6
| 314412 ||  || — || October 25, 2005 || Kitt Peak || Spacewatch || — || align=right | 2.3 km || 
|-id=413 bgcolor=#d6d6d6
| 314413 ||  || — || October 28, 2005 || Mount Lemmon || Mount Lemmon Survey || — || align=right | 2.9 km || 
|-id=414 bgcolor=#d6d6d6
| 314414 ||  || — || October 29, 2005 || Kitt Peak || Spacewatch || — || align=right | 2.9 km || 
|-id=415 bgcolor=#d6d6d6
| 314415 ||  || — || October 31, 2005 || Kitt Peak || Spacewatch || — || align=right | 2.3 km || 
|-id=416 bgcolor=#d6d6d6
| 314416 ||  || — || October 25, 2005 || Catalina || CSS || — || align=right | 3.7 km || 
|-id=417 bgcolor=#d6d6d6
| 314417 ||  || — || October 28, 2005 || Catalina || CSS || HYG || align=right | 3.4 km || 
|-id=418 bgcolor=#d6d6d6
| 314418 ||  || — || October 27, 2005 || Kitt Peak || Spacewatch || — || align=right | 4.2 km || 
|-id=419 bgcolor=#d6d6d6
| 314419 ||  || — || October 27, 2005 || Kitt Peak || Spacewatch || — || align=right | 4.7 km || 
|-id=420 bgcolor=#d6d6d6
| 314420 ||  || — || October 27, 2005 || Kitt Peak || Spacewatch || — || align=right | 2.4 km || 
|-id=421 bgcolor=#d6d6d6
| 314421 ||  || — || October 31, 2005 || Anderson Mesa || LONEOS || EOS || align=right | 2.4 km || 
|-id=422 bgcolor=#d6d6d6
| 314422 ||  || — || October 25, 2005 || Kitt Peak || Spacewatch || KOR || align=right | 1.6 km || 
|-id=423 bgcolor=#d6d6d6
| 314423 ||  || — || October 25, 2005 || Kitt Peak || Spacewatch || — || align=right | 2.9 km || 
|-id=424 bgcolor=#d6d6d6
| 314424 ||  || — || October 28, 2005 || Kitt Peak || Spacewatch || — || align=right | 1.9 km || 
|-id=425 bgcolor=#d6d6d6
| 314425 ||  || — || October 28, 2005 || Kitt Peak || Spacewatch || — || align=right | 3.0 km || 
|-id=426 bgcolor=#d6d6d6
| 314426 ||  || — || October 29, 2005 || Palomar || NEAT || — || align=right | 2.3 km || 
|-id=427 bgcolor=#d6d6d6
| 314427 ||  || — || October 31, 2005 || Mount Lemmon || Mount Lemmon Survey || THM || align=right | 2.3 km || 
|-id=428 bgcolor=#d6d6d6
| 314428 ||  || — || October 30, 2005 || Kitt Peak || Spacewatch || KAR || align=right | 1.2 km || 
|-id=429 bgcolor=#d6d6d6
| 314429 ||  || — || October 30, 2005 || Mount Lemmon || Mount Lemmon Survey || — || align=right | 3.7 km || 
|-id=430 bgcolor=#d6d6d6
| 314430 ||  || — || October 25, 2005 || Kitt Peak || Spacewatch || — || align=right | 2.7 km || 
|-id=431 bgcolor=#fefefe
| 314431 ||  || — || October 22, 2005 || Palomar || NEAT || H || align=right data-sort-value="0.98" | 980 m || 
|-id=432 bgcolor=#fefefe
| 314432 ||  || — || October 24, 2005 || Siding Spring || SSS || H || align=right data-sort-value="0.74" | 740 m || 
|-id=433 bgcolor=#E9E9E9
| 314433 ||  || — || October 26, 2005 || Anderson Mesa || LONEOS || — || align=right | 3.6 km || 
|-id=434 bgcolor=#d6d6d6
| 314434 ||  || — || October 28, 2005 || Mount Lemmon || Mount Lemmon Survey || — || align=right | 3.2 km || 
|-id=435 bgcolor=#d6d6d6
| 314435 ||  || — || October 24, 2005 || Kitt Peak || Spacewatch || EOS || align=right | 2.4 km || 
|-id=436 bgcolor=#d6d6d6
| 314436 ||  || — || October 22, 2005 || Apache Point || A. C. Becker || — || align=right | 2.8 km || 
|-id=437 bgcolor=#d6d6d6
| 314437 ||  || — || October 26, 2005 || Apache Point || A. C. Becker || — || align=right | 2.1 km || 
|-id=438 bgcolor=#d6d6d6
| 314438 ||  || — || October 25, 2005 || Kitt Peak || Spacewatch || — || align=right | 2.8 km || 
|-id=439 bgcolor=#d6d6d6
| 314439 ||  || — || October 25, 2005 || Mount Lemmon || Mount Lemmon Survey || — || align=right | 2.7 km || 
|-id=440 bgcolor=#d6d6d6
| 314440 ||  || — || October 22, 2005 || Kitt Peak || Spacewatch || EOS || align=right | 1.8 km || 
|-id=441 bgcolor=#d6d6d6
| 314441 ||  || — || November 1, 2005 || Catalina || CSS || — || align=right | 3.6 km || 
|-id=442 bgcolor=#d6d6d6
| 314442 ||  || — || November 2, 2005 || Socorro || LINEAR || — || align=right | 4.3 km || 
|-id=443 bgcolor=#d6d6d6
| 314443 ||  || — || November 2, 2005 || Socorro || LINEAR || — || align=right | 3.4 km || 
|-id=444 bgcolor=#d6d6d6
| 314444 ||  || — || November 3, 2005 || Catalina || CSS || — || align=right | 2.0 km || 
|-id=445 bgcolor=#d6d6d6
| 314445 ||  || — || November 5, 2005 || Kitt Peak || Spacewatch || — || align=right | 2.4 km || 
|-id=446 bgcolor=#d6d6d6
| 314446 ||  || — || November 1, 2005 || Mount Lemmon || Mount Lemmon Survey || THM || align=right | 1.9 km || 
|-id=447 bgcolor=#d6d6d6
| 314447 ||  || — || November 3, 2005 || Socorro || LINEAR || — || align=right | 4.9 km || 
|-id=448 bgcolor=#d6d6d6
| 314448 ||  || — || November 6, 2005 || Kitt Peak || Spacewatch || — || align=right | 2.3 km || 
|-id=449 bgcolor=#d6d6d6
| 314449 ||  || — || November 6, 2005 || Mount Lemmon || Mount Lemmon Survey || EOS || align=right | 2.3 km || 
|-id=450 bgcolor=#d6d6d6
| 314450 ||  || — || November 2, 2005 || Mount Lemmon || Mount Lemmon Survey || LIX || align=right | 3.9 km || 
|-id=451 bgcolor=#d6d6d6
| 314451 ||  || — || November 10, 2005 || Kitt Peak || Spacewatch || — || align=right | 2.7 km || 
|-id=452 bgcolor=#d6d6d6
| 314452 ||  || — || November 10, 2005 || Kitt Peak || Spacewatch || 637 || align=right | 2.2 km || 
|-id=453 bgcolor=#d6d6d6
| 314453 ||  || — || November 11, 2005 || Kitt Peak || Spacewatch || EOS || align=right | 2.3 km || 
|-id=454 bgcolor=#d6d6d6
| 314454 ||  || — || November 11, 2005 || Kitt Peak || Spacewatch || THM || align=right | 3.2 km || 
|-id=455 bgcolor=#E9E9E9
| 314455 ||  || — || November 1, 2005 || Apache Point || A. C. Becker || — || align=right | 2.7 km || 
|-id=456 bgcolor=#d6d6d6
| 314456 ||  || — || November 1, 2005 || Apache Point || A. C. Becker || — || align=right | 2.6 km || 
|-id=457 bgcolor=#d6d6d6
| 314457 || 2005 WL || — || November 20, 2005 || Wrightwood || J. W. Young || — || align=right | 2.7 km || 
|-id=458 bgcolor=#d6d6d6
| 314458 ||  || — || November 21, 2005 || Socorro || LINEAR || EUP || align=right | 4.2 km || 
|-id=459 bgcolor=#d6d6d6
| 314459 ||  || — || November 21, 2005 || Catalina || CSS || LIX || align=right | 4.3 km || 
|-id=460 bgcolor=#d6d6d6
| 314460 ||  || — || November 21, 2005 || Kitt Peak || Spacewatch || — || align=right | 3.3 km || 
|-id=461 bgcolor=#d6d6d6
| 314461 ||  || — || November 21, 2005 || Kitt Peak || Spacewatch || — || align=right | 2.4 km || 
|-id=462 bgcolor=#d6d6d6
| 314462 ||  || — || November 22, 2005 || Kitt Peak || Spacewatch || — || align=right | 3.4 km || 
|-id=463 bgcolor=#d6d6d6
| 314463 ||  || — || November 21, 2005 || Kitt Peak || Spacewatch || — || align=right | 2.3 km || 
|-id=464 bgcolor=#d6d6d6
| 314464 ||  || — || November 21, 2005 || Kitt Peak || Spacewatch || EOS || align=right | 2.4 km || 
|-id=465 bgcolor=#d6d6d6
| 314465 ||  || — || November 22, 2005 || Kitt Peak || Spacewatch || — || align=right | 3.1 km || 
|-id=466 bgcolor=#d6d6d6
| 314466 ||  || — || November 30, 2005 || Junk Bond || D. Healy || CRO || align=right | 3.7 km || 
|-id=467 bgcolor=#d6d6d6
| 314467 ||  || — || November 24, 2005 || Palomar || NEAT || — || align=right | 3.8 km || 
|-id=468 bgcolor=#d6d6d6
| 314468 ||  || — || November 22, 2005 || Kitt Peak || Spacewatch || — || align=right | 2.8 km || 
|-id=469 bgcolor=#d6d6d6
| 314469 ||  || — || November 26, 2005 || Kitt Peak || Spacewatch || EOS || align=right | 2.0 km || 
|-id=470 bgcolor=#d6d6d6
| 314470 ||  || — || November 22, 2005 || Kitt Peak || Spacewatch || — || align=right | 2.3 km || 
|-id=471 bgcolor=#d6d6d6
| 314471 ||  || — || November 25, 2005 || Kitt Peak || Spacewatch || — || align=right | 3.9 km || 
|-id=472 bgcolor=#d6d6d6
| 314472 ||  || — || November 25, 2005 || Kitt Peak || Spacewatch || — || align=right | 3.9 km || 
|-id=473 bgcolor=#d6d6d6
| 314473 ||  || — || November 25, 2005 || Kitt Peak || Spacewatch || — || align=right | 2.3 km || 
|-id=474 bgcolor=#d6d6d6
| 314474 ||  || — || October 25, 2005 || Mount Lemmon || Mount Lemmon Survey || — || align=right | 4.0 km || 
|-id=475 bgcolor=#d6d6d6
| 314475 ||  || — || November 28, 2005 || Socorro || LINEAR || — || align=right | 3.3 km || 
|-id=476 bgcolor=#d6d6d6
| 314476 ||  || — || November 26, 2005 || Kitt Peak || Spacewatch || — || align=right | 2.7 km || 
|-id=477 bgcolor=#d6d6d6
| 314477 ||  || — || November 26, 2005 || Mount Lemmon || Mount Lemmon Survey || — || align=right | 3.2 km || 
|-id=478 bgcolor=#d6d6d6
| 314478 ||  || — || November 28, 2005 || Palomar || NEAT || — || align=right | 4.1 km || 
|-id=479 bgcolor=#d6d6d6
| 314479 ||  || — || November 24, 2005 || Palomar || NEAT || — || align=right | 3.7 km || 
|-id=480 bgcolor=#d6d6d6
| 314480 ||  || — || November 28, 2005 || Catalina || CSS || — || align=right | 3.8 km || 
|-id=481 bgcolor=#d6d6d6
| 314481 ||  || — || November 29, 2005 || Mount Lemmon || Mount Lemmon Survey || URS || align=right | 4.4 km || 
|-id=482 bgcolor=#d6d6d6
| 314482 ||  || — || November 29, 2005 || Socorro || LINEAR || — || align=right | 5.7 km || 
|-id=483 bgcolor=#d6d6d6
| 314483 ||  || — || November 25, 2005 || Mount Lemmon || Mount Lemmon Survey || — || align=right | 2.1 km || 
|-id=484 bgcolor=#d6d6d6
| 314484 ||  || — || November 26, 2005 || Mount Lemmon || Mount Lemmon Survey || — || align=right | 2.9 km || 
|-id=485 bgcolor=#d6d6d6
| 314485 ||  || — || November 29, 2005 || Mount Lemmon || Mount Lemmon Survey || HYG || align=right | 2.5 km || 
|-id=486 bgcolor=#d6d6d6
| 314486 ||  || — || November 29, 2005 || Socorro || LINEAR || EUP || align=right | 5.2 km || 
|-id=487 bgcolor=#d6d6d6
| 314487 ||  || — || November 25, 2005 || Kitt Peak || Spacewatch || — || align=right | 2.7 km || 
|-id=488 bgcolor=#d6d6d6
| 314488 ||  || — || November 29, 2005 || Mount Lemmon || Mount Lemmon Survey || THM || align=right | 1.8 km || 
|-id=489 bgcolor=#d6d6d6
| 314489 ||  || — || November 29, 2005 || Mount Lemmon || Mount Lemmon Survey || — || align=right | 2.5 km || 
|-id=490 bgcolor=#d6d6d6
| 314490 ||  || — || November 30, 2005 || Kitt Peak || Spacewatch || — || align=right | 2.7 km || 
|-id=491 bgcolor=#d6d6d6
| 314491 ||  || — || November 21, 2005 || Catalina || CSS || — || align=right | 3.8 km || 
|-id=492 bgcolor=#d6d6d6
| 314492 ||  || — || November 25, 2005 || Catalina || CSS || — || align=right | 3.4 km || 
|-id=493 bgcolor=#d6d6d6
| 314493 ||  || — || November 28, 2005 || Socorro || LINEAR || — || align=right | 2.9 km || 
|-id=494 bgcolor=#d6d6d6
| 314494 ||  || — || November 29, 2005 || Socorro || LINEAR || — || align=right | 3.8 km || 
|-id=495 bgcolor=#d6d6d6
| 314495 ||  || — || November 29, 2005 || Kitt Peak || Spacewatch || — || align=right | 2.8 km || 
|-id=496 bgcolor=#d6d6d6
| 314496 ||  || — || November 21, 2005 || Anderson Mesa || LONEOS || — || align=right | 4.1 km || 
|-id=497 bgcolor=#d6d6d6
| 314497 ||  || — || November 21, 2005 || Catalina || CSS || — || align=right | 3.3 km || 
|-id=498 bgcolor=#fefefe
| 314498 ||  || — || November 26, 2005 || Catalina || CSS || — || align=right | 1.2 km || 
|-id=499 bgcolor=#d6d6d6
| 314499 ||  || — || November 29, 2005 || Catalina || CSS || EUP || align=right | 3.7 km || 
|-id=500 bgcolor=#d6d6d6
| 314500 ||  || — || November 25, 2005 || Mount Lemmon || Mount Lemmon Survey || — || align=right | 4.1 km || 
|}

314501–314600 

|-bgcolor=#d6d6d6
| 314501 ||  || — || November 25, 2005 || Kitt Peak || Spacewatch || — || align=right | 3.7 km || 
|-id=502 bgcolor=#d6d6d6
| 314502 ||  || — || November 22, 2005 || Kitt Peak || Spacewatch || — || align=right | 2.6 km || 
|-id=503 bgcolor=#d6d6d6
| 314503 ||  || — || November 22, 2005 || Kitt Peak || Spacewatch || — || align=right | 2.6 km || 
|-id=504 bgcolor=#d6d6d6
| 314504 ||  || — || December 1, 2005 || Mount Lemmon || Mount Lemmon Survey || — || align=right | 3.4 km || 
|-id=505 bgcolor=#d6d6d6
| 314505 ||  || — || December 1, 2005 || Kitt Peak || Spacewatch || — || align=right | 3.5 km || 
|-id=506 bgcolor=#d6d6d6
| 314506 ||  || — || December 1, 2005 || Palomar || NEAT || EOS || align=right | 2.5 km || 
|-id=507 bgcolor=#fefefe
| 314507 ||  || — || December 2, 2005 || Catalina || CSS || H || align=right data-sort-value="0.91" | 910 m || 
|-id=508 bgcolor=#d6d6d6
| 314508 ||  || — || December 1, 2005 || Kitt Peak || Spacewatch || MEL || align=right | 4.2 km || 
|-id=509 bgcolor=#d6d6d6
| 314509 ||  || — || December 4, 2005 || Kitt Peak || Spacewatch || — || align=right | 4.2 km || 
|-id=510 bgcolor=#d6d6d6
| 314510 ||  || — || December 4, 2005 || Kitt Peak || Spacewatch || — || align=right | 2.3 km || 
|-id=511 bgcolor=#d6d6d6
| 314511 ||  || — || December 1, 2005 || Kitt Peak || Spacewatch || TEL || align=right | 1.9 km || 
|-id=512 bgcolor=#d6d6d6
| 314512 ||  || — || December 5, 2005 || Socorro || LINEAR || — || align=right | 4.0 km || 
|-id=513 bgcolor=#d6d6d6
| 314513 ||  || — || December 6, 2005 || Kitt Peak || Spacewatch || — || align=right | 4.3 km || 
|-id=514 bgcolor=#d6d6d6
| 314514 ||  || — || December 6, 2005 || Catalina || CSS || TIR || align=right | 3.4 km || 
|-id=515 bgcolor=#d6d6d6
| 314515 ||  || — || December 5, 2005 || Socorro || LINEAR || — || align=right | 4.2 km || 
|-id=516 bgcolor=#d6d6d6
| 314516 ||  || — || December 1, 2005 || Anderson Mesa || LONEOS || — || align=right | 3.7 km || 
|-id=517 bgcolor=#d6d6d6
| 314517 ||  || — || November 30, 2005 || Kitt Peak || Spacewatch || EOS || align=right | 2.3 km || 
|-id=518 bgcolor=#d6d6d6
| 314518 ||  || — || December 21, 2005 || Catalina || CSS || THB || align=right | 4.2 km || 
|-id=519 bgcolor=#d6d6d6
| 314519 ||  || — || December 21, 2005 || Kitt Peak || Spacewatch || — || align=right | 3.1 km || 
|-id=520 bgcolor=#d6d6d6
| 314520 ||  || — || December 21, 2005 || Kitt Peak || Spacewatch || — || align=right | 3.3 km || 
|-id=521 bgcolor=#d6d6d6
| 314521 ||  || — || December 21, 2005 || Kitt Peak || Spacewatch || — || align=right | 3.0 km || 
|-id=522 bgcolor=#d6d6d6
| 314522 ||  || — || December 21, 2005 || Kitt Peak || Spacewatch || — || align=right | 2.4 km || 
|-id=523 bgcolor=#d6d6d6
| 314523 ||  || — || December 21, 2005 || Kitt Peak || Spacewatch || — || align=right | 2.4 km || 
|-id=524 bgcolor=#d6d6d6
| 314524 ||  || — || December 22, 2005 || Kitt Peak || Spacewatch || — || align=right | 4.2 km || 
|-id=525 bgcolor=#d6d6d6
| 314525 ||  || — || December 22, 2005 || Kitt Peak || Spacewatch || — || align=right | 4.3 km || 
|-id=526 bgcolor=#d6d6d6
| 314526 ||  || — || December 22, 2005 || Kitt Peak || Spacewatch || — || align=right | 3.0 km || 
|-id=527 bgcolor=#d6d6d6
| 314527 ||  || — || December 24, 2005 || Kitt Peak || Spacewatch || HYG || align=right | 3.5 km || 
|-id=528 bgcolor=#d6d6d6
| 314528 ||  || — || December 24, 2005 || Kitt Peak || Spacewatch || — || align=right | 3.9 km || 
|-id=529 bgcolor=#d6d6d6
| 314529 ||  || — || December 22, 2005 || Kitt Peak || Spacewatch || EOS || align=right | 2.6 km || 
|-id=530 bgcolor=#d6d6d6
| 314530 ||  || — || December 22, 2005 || Kitt Peak || Spacewatch || HYG || align=right | 4.0 km || 
|-id=531 bgcolor=#d6d6d6
| 314531 ||  || — || December 22, 2005 || Kitt Peak || Spacewatch || — || align=right | 2.9 km || 
|-id=532 bgcolor=#d6d6d6
| 314532 ||  || — || December 22, 2005 || Kitt Peak || Spacewatch || EUP || align=right | 6.0 km || 
|-id=533 bgcolor=#d6d6d6
| 314533 ||  || — || December 24, 2005 || Kitt Peak || Spacewatch || VER || align=right | 4.0 km || 
|-id=534 bgcolor=#d6d6d6
| 314534 ||  || — || December 24, 2005 || Kitt Peak || Spacewatch || — || align=right | 4.9 km || 
|-id=535 bgcolor=#d6d6d6
| 314535 ||  || — || December 22, 2005 || Kitt Peak || Spacewatch || — || align=right | 3.9 km || 
|-id=536 bgcolor=#d6d6d6
| 314536 ||  || — || December 25, 2005 || Kitt Peak || Spacewatch || — || align=right | 3.5 km || 
|-id=537 bgcolor=#d6d6d6
| 314537 ||  || — || December 26, 2005 || Kitt Peak || Spacewatch || — || align=right | 3.7 km || 
|-id=538 bgcolor=#d6d6d6
| 314538 ||  || — || December 26, 2005 || Kitt Peak || Spacewatch || HYG || align=right | 3.9 km || 
|-id=539 bgcolor=#d6d6d6
| 314539 ||  || — || December 24, 2005 || Kitt Peak || Spacewatch || — || align=right | 5.4 km || 
|-id=540 bgcolor=#d6d6d6
| 314540 ||  || — || December 24, 2005 || Kitt Peak || Spacewatch || — || align=right | 4.7 km || 
|-id=541 bgcolor=#d6d6d6
| 314541 ||  || — || December 24, 2005 || Kitt Peak || Spacewatch || — || align=right | 4.9 km || 
|-id=542 bgcolor=#d6d6d6
| 314542 ||  || — || December 26, 2005 || Mount Lemmon || Mount Lemmon Survey || — || align=right | 3.9 km || 
|-id=543 bgcolor=#d6d6d6
| 314543 ||  || — || December 27, 2005 || Mount Lemmon || Mount Lemmon Survey || — || align=right | 3.6 km || 
|-id=544 bgcolor=#d6d6d6
| 314544 ||  || — || December 22, 2005 || Palomar || NEAT || — || align=right | 3.5 km || 
|-id=545 bgcolor=#d6d6d6
| 314545 ||  || — || December 25, 2005 || Mount Lemmon || Mount Lemmon Survey || — || align=right | 4.3 km || 
|-id=546 bgcolor=#d6d6d6
| 314546 ||  || — || December 25, 2005 || Mount Lemmon || Mount Lemmon Survey || HYG || align=right | 4.2 km || 
|-id=547 bgcolor=#d6d6d6
| 314547 ||  || — || December 25, 2005 || Kitt Peak || Spacewatch || HYG || align=right | 3.6 km || 
|-id=548 bgcolor=#d6d6d6
| 314548 ||  || — || December 25, 2005 || Kitt Peak || Spacewatch || CRO || align=right | 3.7 km || 
|-id=549 bgcolor=#d6d6d6
| 314549 ||  || — || December 26, 2005 || Kitt Peak || Spacewatch || — || align=right | 4.5 km || 
|-id=550 bgcolor=#d6d6d6
| 314550 ||  || — || December 26, 2005 || Kitt Peak || Spacewatch || — || align=right | 3.1 km || 
|-id=551 bgcolor=#d6d6d6
| 314551 ||  || — || December 26, 2005 || Kitt Peak || Spacewatch || — || align=right | 4.6 km || 
|-id=552 bgcolor=#d6d6d6
| 314552 ||  || — || December 26, 2005 || Kitt Peak || Spacewatch || — || align=right | 3.6 km || 
|-id=553 bgcolor=#d6d6d6
| 314553 ||  || — || December 28, 2005 || Kitt Peak || Spacewatch || THM || align=right | 2.4 km || 
|-id=554 bgcolor=#d6d6d6
| 314554 ||  || — || December 29, 2005 || Socorro || LINEAR || — || align=right | 4.4 km || 
|-id=555 bgcolor=#d6d6d6
| 314555 ||  || — || December 25, 2005 || Mount Lemmon || Mount Lemmon Survey || — || align=right | 3.0 km || 
|-id=556 bgcolor=#d6d6d6
| 314556 ||  || — || December 25, 2005 || Catalina || CSS || — || align=right | 6.1 km || 
|-id=557 bgcolor=#d6d6d6
| 314557 ||  || — || March 23, 1995 || Kitt Peak || Spacewatch || HYG || align=right | 2.6 km || 
|-id=558 bgcolor=#d6d6d6
| 314558 ||  || — || December 27, 2005 || Kitt Peak || Spacewatch || — || align=right | 3.8 km || 
|-id=559 bgcolor=#d6d6d6
| 314559 ||  || — || January 8, 1995 || Kitt Peak || Spacewatch || — || align=right | 4.1 km || 
|-id=560 bgcolor=#d6d6d6
| 314560 ||  || — || December 25, 2005 || Anderson Mesa || LONEOS || — || align=right | 4.9 km || 
|-id=561 bgcolor=#d6d6d6
| 314561 ||  || — || December 29, 2005 || Kitt Peak || Spacewatch || — || align=right | 4.6 km || 
|-id=562 bgcolor=#d6d6d6
| 314562 ||  || — || December 30, 2005 || Kitt Peak || Spacewatch || — || align=right | 3.6 km || 
|-id=563 bgcolor=#d6d6d6
| 314563 ||  || — || December 30, 2005 || Socorro || LINEAR || TIR || align=right | 4.1 km || 
|-id=564 bgcolor=#d6d6d6
| 314564 ||  || — || December 22, 2005 || Kitt Peak || Spacewatch || EUP || align=right | 5.1 km || 
|-id=565 bgcolor=#d6d6d6
| 314565 ||  || — || December 22, 2005 || Kitt Peak || Spacewatch || THM || align=right | 2.7 km || 
|-id=566 bgcolor=#d6d6d6
| 314566 ||  || — || December 30, 2005 || Socorro || LINEAR || — || align=right | 3.6 km || 
|-id=567 bgcolor=#d6d6d6
| 314567 ||  || — || December 25, 2005 || Anderson Mesa || LONEOS || TIR || align=right | 4.0 km || 
|-id=568 bgcolor=#d6d6d6
| 314568 ||  || — || December 27, 2005 || Socorro || LINEAR || — || align=right | 5.5 km || 
|-id=569 bgcolor=#d6d6d6
| 314569 ||  || — || December 27, 2005 || Kitt Peak || Spacewatch || — || align=right | 2.5 km || 
|-id=570 bgcolor=#d6d6d6
| 314570 ||  || — || December 28, 2005 || Kitt Peak || Spacewatch || EOS || align=right | 2.1 km || 
|-id=571 bgcolor=#d6d6d6
| 314571 ||  || — || December 30, 2005 || Kitt Peak || Spacewatch || — || align=right | 3.7 km || 
|-id=572 bgcolor=#d6d6d6
| 314572 ||  || — || December 25, 2005 || Kitt Peak || Spacewatch || — || align=right | 4.6 km || 
|-id=573 bgcolor=#d6d6d6
| 314573 ||  || — || December 29, 2005 || Socorro || LINEAR || EOS || align=right | 2.7 km || 
|-id=574 bgcolor=#d6d6d6
| 314574 ||  || — || December 29, 2005 || Socorro || LINEAR || — || align=right | 5.1 km || 
|-id=575 bgcolor=#d6d6d6
| 314575 ||  || — || December 30, 2005 || Catalina || CSS || EUP || align=right | 4.0 km || 
|-id=576 bgcolor=#d6d6d6
| 314576 ||  || — || December 10, 2005 || Kitt Peak || Spacewatch || EUP || align=right | 4.2 km || 
|-id=577 bgcolor=#d6d6d6
| 314577 ||  || — || December 29, 2005 || Mount Lemmon || Mount Lemmon Survey || — || align=right | 2.9 km || 
|-id=578 bgcolor=#d6d6d6
| 314578 ||  || — || December 23, 2005 || Socorro || LINEAR || — || align=right | 4.8 km || 
|-id=579 bgcolor=#d6d6d6
| 314579 ||  || — || December 28, 2005 || Kitt Peak || Spacewatch || — || align=right | 3.2 km || 
|-id=580 bgcolor=#d6d6d6
| 314580 ||  || — || December 31, 2005 || Kitt Peak || Spacewatch || — || align=right | 4.4 km || 
|-id=581 bgcolor=#d6d6d6
| 314581 ||  || — || December 25, 2005 || Kitt Peak || Spacewatch || THM || align=right | 2.8 km || 
|-id=582 bgcolor=#d6d6d6
| 314582 ||  || — || December 30, 2005 || Mount Lemmon || Mount Lemmon Survey || VER || align=right | 4.1 km || 
|-id=583 bgcolor=#d6d6d6
| 314583 ||  || — || December 29, 2005 || Mount Lemmon || Mount Lemmon Survey || — || align=right | 2.3 km || 
|-id=584 bgcolor=#d6d6d6
| 314584 ||  || — || January 7, 2006 || Anderson Mesa || LONEOS || THB || align=right | 3.7 km || 
|-id=585 bgcolor=#d6d6d6
| 314585 ||  || — || January 4, 2006 || Mount Lemmon || Mount Lemmon Survey || — || align=right | 3.7 km || 
|-id=586 bgcolor=#d6d6d6
| 314586 ||  || — || January 4, 2006 || Mount Lemmon || Mount Lemmon Survey || — || align=right | 3.8 km || 
|-id=587 bgcolor=#d6d6d6
| 314587 ||  || — || January 4, 2006 || Kitt Peak || Spacewatch || — || align=right | 3.4 km || 
|-id=588 bgcolor=#d6d6d6
| 314588 ||  || — || January 5, 2006 || Catalina || CSS || EOS || align=right | 3.0 km || 
|-id=589 bgcolor=#d6d6d6
| 314589 ||  || — || January 5, 2006 || Catalina || CSS || EUP || align=right | 4.9 km || 
|-id=590 bgcolor=#d6d6d6
| 314590 ||  || — || January 5, 2006 || Kitt Peak || Spacewatch || HYG || align=right | 3.4 km || 
|-id=591 bgcolor=#d6d6d6
| 314591 ||  || — || January 5, 2006 || Socorro || LINEAR || VER || align=right | 3.9 km || 
|-id=592 bgcolor=#d6d6d6
| 314592 ||  || — || April 13, 2001 || Kitt Peak || Spacewatch || — || align=right | 4.4 km || 
|-id=593 bgcolor=#d6d6d6
| 314593 ||  || — || January 2, 2006 || Mount Lemmon || Mount Lemmon Survey || — || align=right | 4.1 km || 
|-id=594 bgcolor=#d6d6d6
| 314594 ||  || — || January 7, 2006 || Kitt Peak || Spacewatch || — || align=right | 3.4 km || 
|-id=595 bgcolor=#d6d6d6
| 314595 ||  || — || January 5, 2006 || Kitt Peak || Spacewatch || — || align=right | 4.7 km || 
|-id=596 bgcolor=#d6d6d6
| 314596 ||  || — || January 6, 2006 || Mount Lemmon || Mount Lemmon Survey || HYG || align=right | 3.7 km || 
|-id=597 bgcolor=#d6d6d6
| 314597 ||  || — || January 6, 2006 || Socorro || LINEAR || — || align=right | 4.7 km || 
|-id=598 bgcolor=#d6d6d6
| 314598 ||  || — || January 5, 2006 || Socorro || LINEAR || TIR || align=right | 5.2 km || 
|-id=599 bgcolor=#d6d6d6
| 314599 ||  || — || December 22, 2005 || Kitt Peak || Spacewatch || THM || align=right | 1.8 km || 
|-id=600 bgcolor=#d6d6d6
| 314600 ||  || — || January 5, 2006 || Catalina || CSS || — || align=right | 2.7 km || 
|}

314601–314700 

|-bgcolor=#d6d6d6
| 314601 ||  || — || January 20, 2006 || Palomar || NEAT || — || align=right | 3.9 km || 
|-id=602 bgcolor=#d6d6d6
| 314602 ||  || — || January 20, 2006 || Catalina || CSS || — || align=right | 4.8 km || 
|-id=603 bgcolor=#d6d6d6
| 314603 ||  || — || January 22, 2006 || Mount Lemmon || Mount Lemmon Survey || 7:4 || align=right | 2.7 km || 
|-id=604 bgcolor=#d6d6d6
| 314604 ||  || — || January 23, 2006 || Kitt Peak || Spacewatch || — || align=right | 4.6 km || 
|-id=605 bgcolor=#d6d6d6
| 314605 ||  || — || January 23, 2006 || Kitt Peak || Spacewatch || — || align=right | 2.8 km || 
|-id=606 bgcolor=#fefefe
| 314606 ||  || — || January 24, 2006 || Anderson Mesa || LONEOS || — || align=right data-sort-value="0.82" | 820 m || 
|-id=607 bgcolor=#d6d6d6
| 314607 ||  || — || January 31, 2006 || Mount Lemmon || Mount Lemmon Survey || — || align=right | 4.3 km || 
|-id=608 bgcolor=#d6d6d6
| 314608 ||  || — || January 23, 2006 || Kitt Peak || Spacewatch || — || align=right | 4.2 km || 
|-id=609 bgcolor=#d6d6d6
| 314609 ||  || — || January 23, 2006 || Kitt Peak || Spacewatch || — || align=right | 4.4 km || 
|-id=610 bgcolor=#d6d6d6
| 314610 ||  || — || February 3, 2006 || Kitt Peak || Spacewatch || LIX || align=right | 4.0 km || 
|-id=611 bgcolor=#d6d6d6
| 314611 ||  || — || February 20, 2006 || Mount Lemmon || Mount Lemmon Survey || HYG || align=right | 3.8 km || 
|-id=612 bgcolor=#fefefe
| 314612 ||  || — || February 20, 2006 || Kitt Peak || Spacewatch || — || align=right data-sort-value="0.64" | 640 m || 
|-id=613 bgcolor=#d6d6d6
| 314613 ||  || — || February 24, 2006 || Kitt Peak || Spacewatch || — || align=right | 3.8 km || 
|-id=614 bgcolor=#fefefe
| 314614 ||  || — || February 24, 2006 || Mount Lemmon || Mount Lemmon Survey || V || align=right data-sort-value="0.85" | 850 m || 
|-id=615 bgcolor=#fefefe
| 314615 ||  || — || February 24, 2006 || Mount Lemmon || Mount Lemmon Survey || — || align=right data-sort-value="0.59" | 590 m || 
|-id=616 bgcolor=#fefefe
| 314616 ||  || — || February 25, 2006 || Mount Lemmon || Mount Lemmon Survey || FLO || align=right data-sort-value="0.89" | 890 m || 
|-id=617 bgcolor=#d6d6d6
| 314617 ||  || — || February 22, 2006 || Catalina || CSS || — || align=right | 4.8 km || 
|-id=618 bgcolor=#d6d6d6
| 314618 ||  || — || February 24, 2006 || Mount Lemmon || Mount Lemmon Survey || HYG || align=right | 3.1 km || 
|-id=619 bgcolor=#d6d6d6
| 314619 ||  || — || February 24, 2006 || Palomar || NEAT || ALA || align=right | 5.6 km || 
|-id=620 bgcolor=#fefefe
| 314620 ||  || — || March 5, 2006 || Kitt Peak || Spacewatch || — || align=right data-sort-value="0.80" | 800 m || 
|-id=621 bgcolor=#fefefe
| 314621 ||  || — || March 23, 2006 || Kitt Peak || Spacewatch || — || align=right data-sort-value="0.71" | 710 m || 
|-id=622 bgcolor=#fefefe
| 314622 ||  || — || March 23, 2006 || Kitt Peak || Spacewatch || — || align=right data-sort-value="0.70" | 700 m || 
|-id=623 bgcolor=#fefefe
| 314623 ||  || — || March 24, 2006 || Mount Lemmon || Mount Lemmon Survey || — || align=right data-sort-value="0.67" | 670 m || 
|-id=624 bgcolor=#fefefe
| 314624 ||  || — || March 26, 2006 || Mount Lemmon || Mount Lemmon Survey || FLO || align=right data-sort-value="0.85" | 850 m || 
|-id=625 bgcolor=#fefefe
| 314625 ||  || — || March 26, 2006 || Mount Lemmon || Mount Lemmon Survey || — || align=right data-sort-value="0.75" | 750 m || 
|-id=626 bgcolor=#fefefe
| 314626 ||  || — || April 2, 2006 || Kitt Peak || Spacewatch || FLO || align=right data-sort-value="0.54" | 540 m || 
|-id=627 bgcolor=#fefefe
| 314627 ||  || — || April 2, 2006 || Kitt Peak || Spacewatch || V || align=right data-sort-value="0.69" | 690 m || 
|-id=628 bgcolor=#fefefe
| 314628 ||  || — || April 18, 2006 || Kitt Peak || Spacewatch || — || align=right data-sort-value="0.73" | 730 m || 
|-id=629 bgcolor=#fefefe
| 314629 ||  || — || April 19, 2006 || Kitt Peak || Spacewatch || — || align=right data-sort-value="0.85" | 850 m || 
|-id=630 bgcolor=#fefefe
| 314630 ||  || — || April 20, 2006 || Kitt Peak || Spacewatch || — || align=right data-sort-value="0.76" | 760 m || 
|-id=631 bgcolor=#d6d6d6
| 314631 ||  || — || April 20, 2006 || Catalina || CSS || — || align=right | 5.3 km || 
|-id=632 bgcolor=#fefefe
| 314632 ||  || — || April 21, 2006 || Catalina || CSS || — || align=right | 1.1 km || 
|-id=633 bgcolor=#fefefe
| 314633 ||  || — || April 20, 2006 || Kitt Peak || Spacewatch || FLO || align=right data-sort-value="0.65" | 650 m || 
|-id=634 bgcolor=#fefefe
| 314634 ||  || — || April 24, 2006 || Kitt Peak || Spacewatch || FLO || align=right data-sort-value="0.98" | 980 m || 
|-id=635 bgcolor=#fefefe
| 314635 ||  || — || April 30, 2006 || Kitt Peak || Spacewatch || — || align=right | 1.2 km || 
|-id=636 bgcolor=#fefefe
| 314636 ||  || — || April 30, 2006 || Kitt Peak || Spacewatch || — || align=right data-sort-value="0.60" | 600 m || 
|-id=637 bgcolor=#fefefe
| 314637 ||  || — || May 1, 2006 || Reedy Creek || J. Broughton || — || align=right | 1.1 km || 
|-id=638 bgcolor=#fefefe
| 314638 ||  || — || May 5, 2006 || Reedy Creek || J. Broughton || — || align=right | 1.0 km || 
|-id=639 bgcolor=#fefefe
| 314639 ||  || — || May 3, 2006 || Kitt Peak || Spacewatch || — || align=right | 1.2 km || 
|-id=640 bgcolor=#fefefe
| 314640 ||  || — || May 3, 2006 || Kitt Peak || Spacewatch || — || align=right data-sort-value="0.74" | 740 m || 
|-id=641 bgcolor=#fefefe
| 314641 ||  || — || May 4, 2006 || Kitt Peak || Spacewatch || — || align=right data-sort-value="0.75" | 750 m || 
|-id=642 bgcolor=#E9E9E9
| 314642 ||  || — || May 4, 2006 || Kitt Peak || Spacewatch || critical || align=right | 1.1 km || 
|-id=643 bgcolor=#fefefe
| 314643 ||  || — || May 7, 2006 || Mount Lemmon || Mount Lemmon Survey || FLO || align=right data-sort-value="0.79" | 790 m || 
|-id=644 bgcolor=#fefefe
| 314644 ||  || — || May 19, 2006 || Mount Lemmon || Mount Lemmon Survey || — || align=right data-sort-value="0.68" | 680 m || 
|-id=645 bgcolor=#fefefe
| 314645 ||  || — || May 20, 2006 || Kitt Peak || Spacewatch || — || align=right | 1.4 km || 
|-id=646 bgcolor=#fefefe
| 314646 ||  || — || May 20, 2006 || Kitt Peak || Spacewatch || — || align=right | 1.4 km || 
|-id=647 bgcolor=#d6d6d6
| 314647 ||  || — || May 27, 2006 || Kitt Peak || Spacewatch || 3:2 || align=right | 5.5 km || 
|-id=648 bgcolor=#fefefe
| 314648 ||  || — || May 31, 2006 || Mount Lemmon || Mount Lemmon Survey || — || align=right data-sort-value="0.84" | 840 m || 
|-id=649 bgcolor=#fefefe
| 314649 ||  || — || May 23, 2006 || Mount Lemmon || Mount Lemmon Survey || — || align=right data-sort-value="0.61" | 610 m || 
|-id=650 bgcolor=#E9E9E9
| 314650 Neilnorman ||  ||  || July 19, 2006 || Roeser || M. Dawson || JUN || align=right | 2.6 km || 
|-id=651 bgcolor=#C2FFFF
| 314651 ||  || — || July 18, 2006 || Lulin Observatory || LUSS || L4 || align=right | 10 km || 
|-id=652 bgcolor=#fefefe
| 314652 ||  || — || July 18, 2006 || Lulin || LUSS || FLO || align=right data-sort-value="0.75" | 750 m || 
|-id=653 bgcolor=#fefefe
| 314653 ||  || — || July 21, 2006 || Mount Lemmon || Mount Lemmon Survey || — || align=right | 1.1 km || 
|-id=654 bgcolor=#fefefe
| 314654 ||  || — || July 20, 2006 || Palomar || NEAT || V || align=right data-sort-value="0.86" | 860 m || 
|-id=655 bgcolor=#fefefe
| 314655 ||  || — || July 20, 2006 || Palomar || NEAT || — || align=right | 1.3 km || 
|-id=656 bgcolor=#fefefe
| 314656 ||  || — || July 21, 2006 || Catalina || CSS || — || align=right | 1.00 km || 
|-id=657 bgcolor=#fefefe
| 314657 ||  || — || July 25, 2006 || Palomar || NEAT || V || align=right | 1.0 km || 
|-id=658 bgcolor=#fefefe
| 314658 ||  || — || March 11, 2005 || Mount Lemmon || Mount Lemmon Survey || V || align=right data-sort-value="0.94" | 940 m || 
|-id=659 bgcolor=#fefefe
| 314659 ||  || — || August 13, 2006 || Palomar || NEAT || FLO || align=right data-sort-value="0.81" | 810 m || 
|-id=660 bgcolor=#fefefe
| 314660 ||  || — || August 12, 2006 || Palomar || NEAT || NYS || align=right data-sort-value="0.78" | 780 m || 
|-id=661 bgcolor=#fefefe
| 314661 ||  || — || August 16, 2006 || Siding Spring || SSS || — || align=right | 1.2 km || 
|-id=662 bgcolor=#E9E9E9
| 314662 ||  || — || August 17, 2006 || Palomar || NEAT || — || align=right | 1.7 km || 
|-id=663 bgcolor=#fefefe
| 314663 ||  || — || August 17, 2006 || Palomar || NEAT || V || align=right | 1.0 km || 
|-id=664 bgcolor=#fefefe
| 314664 ||  || — || August 17, 2006 || Palomar || NEAT || V || align=right data-sort-value="0.75" | 750 m || 
|-id=665 bgcolor=#E9E9E9
| 314665 ||  || — || August 18, 2006 || Socorro || LINEAR || — || align=right | 1.4 km || 
|-id=666 bgcolor=#fefefe
| 314666 ||  || — || August 18, 2006 || Anderson Mesa || LONEOS || — || align=right | 2.1 km || 
|-id=667 bgcolor=#E9E9E9
| 314667 ||  || — || August 20, 2006 || Kitt Peak || Spacewatch || — || align=right | 1.6 km || 
|-id=668 bgcolor=#E9E9E9
| 314668 ||  || — || August 18, 2006 || Kitt Peak || Spacewatch || — || align=right | 2.0 km || 
|-id=669 bgcolor=#E9E9E9
| 314669 ||  || — || August 24, 2006 || Palomar || NEAT || — || align=right | 1.2 km || 
|-id=670 bgcolor=#E9E9E9
| 314670 ||  || — || August 22, 2006 || Palomar || NEAT || EUN || align=right | 1.3 km || 
|-id=671 bgcolor=#fefefe
| 314671 ||  || — || August 27, 2006 || Kitt Peak || Spacewatch || — || align=right data-sort-value="0.66" | 660 m || 
|-id=672 bgcolor=#E9E9E9
| 314672 ||  || — || August 27, 2006 || Kitt Peak || Spacewatch || critical || align=right | 1.2 km || 
|-id=673 bgcolor=#fefefe
| 314673 ||  || — || August 16, 2006 || Palomar || NEAT || V || align=right data-sort-value="0.75" | 750 m || 
|-id=674 bgcolor=#fefefe
| 314674 ||  || — || August 24, 2006 || Palomar || NEAT || — || align=right | 1.2 km || 
|-id=675 bgcolor=#E9E9E9
| 314675 ||  || — || August 28, 2006 || Catalina || CSS || — || align=right | 1.2 km || 
|-id=676 bgcolor=#fefefe
| 314676 ||  || — || August 28, 2006 || Catalina || CSS || NYS || align=right data-sort-value="0.91" | 910 m || 
|-id=677 bgcolor=#d6d6d6
| 314677 ||  || — || August 28, 2006 || Catalina || CSS || — || align=right | 4.3 km || 
|-id=678 bgcolor=#fefefe
| 314678 ||  || — || August 27, 2006 || Anderson Mesa || LONEOS || V || align=right data-sort-value="0.80" | 800 m || 
|-id=679 bgcolor=#E9E9E9
| 314679 ||  || — || August 16, 2006 || Palomar || NEAT || — || align=right | 2.4 km || 
|-id=680 bgcolor=#E9E9E9
| 314680 ||  || — || August 27, 2006 || Anderson Mesa || LONEOS || — || align=right | 2.9 km || 
|-id=681 bgcolor=#fefefe
| 314681 ||  || — || August 29, 2006 || Anderson Mesa || LONEOS || — || align=right | 1.2 km || 
|-id=682 bgcolor=#E9E9E9
| 314682 ||  || — || August 29, 2006 || Anderson Mesa || LONEOS || — || align=right | 3.7 km || 
|-id=683 bgcolor=#E9E9E9
| 314683 ||  || — || August 18, 2006 || Kitt Peak || Spacewatch || — || align=right | 1.0 km || 
|-id=684 bgcolor=#fefefe
| 314684 ||  || — || August 19, 2006 || Kitt Peak || Spacewatch || V || align=right data-sort-value="0.77" | 770 m || 
|-id=685 bgcolor=#fefefe
| 314685 ||  || — || August 19, 2006 || Kitt Peak || Spacewatch || V || align=right data-sort-value="0.88" | 880 m || 
|-id=686 bgcolor=#E9E9E9
| 314686 ||  || — || August 29, 2006 || Anderson Mesa || LONEOS || EUN || align=right | 1.7 km || 
|-id=687 bgcolor=#E9E9E9
| 314687 || 2006 RK || — || September 2, 2006 || Majorca || OAM Obs. || EUN || align=right | 1.5 km || 
|-id=688 bgcolor=#E9E9E9
| 314688 || 2006 RX || — || September 1, 2006 || Marly || Naef Obs. || — || align=right | 4.2 km || 
|-id=689 bgcolor=#fefefe
| 314689 ||  || — || September 14, 2006 || Kitt Peak || Spacewatch || NYS || align=right data-sort-value="0.80" | 800 m || 
|-id=690 bgcolor=#E9E9E9
| 314690 ||  || — || September 13, 2006 || Palomar || NEAT || — || align=right | 2.8 km || 
|-id=691 bgcolor=#E9E9E9
| 314691 ||  || — || September 15, 2006 || Kitt Peak || Spacewatch || — || align=right | 1.1 km || 
|-id=692 bgcolor=#fefefe
| 314692 ||  || — || September 15, 2006 || Kitt Peak || Spacewatch || FLO || align=right data-sort-value="0.83" | 830 m || 
|-id=693 bgcolor=#E9E9E9
| 314693 ||  || — || September 14, 2006 || Kitt Peak || Spacewatch || — || align=right | 1.9 km || 
|-id=694 bgcolor=#E9E9E9
| 314694 ||  || — || September 14, 2006 || Kitt Peak || Spacewatch || — || align=right | 1.5 km || 
|-id=695 bgcolor=#E9E9E9
| 314695 ||  || — || September 14, 2006 || Kitt Peak || Spacewatch || — || align=right | 2.1 km || 
|-id=696 bgcolor=#E9E9E9
| 314696 ||  || — || September 14, 2006 || Kitt Peak || Spacewatch || — || align=right | 1.8 km || 
|-id=697 bgcolor=#E9E9E9
| 314697 ||  || — || September 15, 2006 || Kitt Peak || Spacewatch || — || align=right | 2.2 km || 
|-id=698 bgcolor=#fefefe
| 314698 ||  || — || September 15, 2006 || Kitt Peak || Spacewatch || MAS || align=right data-sort-value="0.92" | 920 m || 
|-id=699 bgcolor=#E9E9E9
| 314699 ||  || — || September 15, 2006 || Kitt Peak || Spacewatch || — || align=right | 1.5 km || 
|-id=700 bgcolor=#E9E9E9
| 314700 ||  || — || September 15, 2006 || Kitt Peak || Spacewatch || — || align=right | 1.1 km || 
|}

314701–314800 

|-bgcolor=#E9E9E9
| 314701 ||  || — || September 14, 2006 || Catalina || CSS || — || align=right | 1.7 km || 
|-id=702 bgcolor=#E9E9E9
| 314702 ||  || — || September 14, 2006 || Palomar || NEAT || ADE || align=right | 2.0 km || 
|-id=703 bgcolor=#E9E9E9
| 314703 ||  || — || September 14, 2006 || Mauna Kea || J. Masiero || — || align=right | 1.2 km || 
|-id=704 bgcolor=#fefefe
| 314704 ||  || — || September 15, 2006 || Kitt Peak || Spacewatch || — || align=right | 1.2 km || 
|-id=705 bgcolor=#E9E9E9
| 314705 ||  || — || September 16, 2006 || Catalina || CSS || ADE || align=right | 2.6 km || 
|-id=706 bgcolor=#E9E9E9
| 314706 ||  || — || September 16, 2006 || Kitt Peak || Spacewatch || — || align=right data-sort-value="0.77" | 770 m || 
|-id=707 bgcolor=#E9E9E9
| 314707 ||  || — || September 16, 2006 || Catalina || CSS || — || align=right | 1.7 km || 
|-id=708 bgcolor=#E9E9E9
| 314708 ||  || — || September 17, 2006 || Hibiscus || S. F. Hönig || — || align=right | 1.6 km || 
|-id=709 bgcolor=#E9E9E9
| 314709 ||  || — || September 17, 2006 || Catalina || CSS || — || align=right | 1.4 km || 
|-id=710 bgcolor=#E9E9E9
| 314710 ||  || — || September 16, 2006 || Anderson Mesa || LONEOS || EUN || align=right | 1.4 km || 
|-id=711 bgcolor=#E9E9E9
| 314711 ||  || — || September 17, 2006 || Kitt Peak || Spacewatch || — || align=right | 2.1 km || 
|-id=712 bgcolor=#E9E9E9
| 314712 ||  || — || September 18, 2006 || Anderson Mesa || LONEOS || IAN || align=right | 1.0 km || 
|-id=713 bgcolor=#E9E9E9
| 314713 ||  || — || September 16, 2006 || Catalina || CSS || EUN || align=right | 1.5 km || 
|-id=714 bgcolor=#E9E9E9
| 314714 ||  || — || September 16, 2006 || Catalina || CSS || — || align=right | 1.9 km || 
|-id=715 bgcolor=#E9E9E9
| 314715 ||  || — || September 16, 2006 || Anderson Mesa || LONEOS || KON || align=right | 2.6 km || 
|-id=716 bgcolor=#FA8072
| 314716 ||  || — || September 19, 2006 || Catalina || CSS || — || align=right | 2.1 km || 
|-id=717 bgcolor=#E9E9E9
| 314717 ||  || — || September 20, 2006 || Catalina || CSS || JUN || align=right | 1.2 km || 
|-id=718 bgcolor=#E9E9E9
| 314718 ||  || — || September 18, 2006 || Calvin-Rehoboth || Calvin–Rehoboth Obs. || — || align=right | 1.7 km || 
|-id=719 bgcolor=#E9E9E9
| 314719 ||  || — || September 18, 2006 || Catalina || CSS || — || align=right | 1.9 km || 
|-id=720 bgcolor=#E9E9E9
| 314720 ||  || — || September 22, 2006 || San Marcello || Pistoia Mountains Obs. || — || align=right | 2.0 km || 
|-id=721 bgcolor=#E9E9E9
| 314721 ||  || — || September 19, 2006 || Kitt Peak || Spacewatch || HEN || align=right | 1.3 km || 
|-id=722 bgcolor=#E9E9E9
| 314722 ||  || — || September 19, 2006 || Kitt Peak || Spacewatch || — || align=right | 1.4 km || 
|-id=723 bgcolor=#E9E9E9
| 314723 ||  || — || September 19, 2006 || Kitt Peak || Spacewatch || — || align=right | 1.7 km || 
|-id=724 bgcolor=#E9E9E9
| 314724 ||  || — || September 19, 2006 || Kitt Peak || Spacewatch || — || align=right | 1.4 km || 
|-id=725 bgcolor=#E9E9E9
| 314725 ||  || — || September 23, 2006 || Piszkéstető || K. Sárneczky, Z. Kuli || — || align=right | 1.0 km || 
|-id=726 bgcolor=#E9E9E9
| 314726 ||  || — || September 16, 2006 || Catalina || CSS || — || align=right | 1.9 km || 
|-id=727 bgcolor=#E9E9E9
| 314727 ||  || — || September 18, 2006 || Kitt Peak || Spacewatch || — || align=right | 1.3 km || 
|-id=728 bgcolor=#E9E9E9
| 314728 ||  || — || September 18, 2006 || Kitt Peak || Spacewatch || — || align=right data-sort-value="0.88" | 880 m || 
|-id=729 bgcolor=#E9E9E9
| 314729 ||  || — || September 18, 2006 || Kitt Peak || Spacewatch || — || align=right | 1.4 km || 
|-id=730 bgcolor=#E9E9E9
| 314730 ||  || — || September 18, 2006 || Kitt Peak || Spacewatch || — || align=right | 1.4 km || 
|-id=731 bgcolor=#E9E9E9
| 314731 ||  || — || September 18, 2006 || Kitt Peak || Spacewatch || — || align=right | 2.1 km || 
|-id=732 bgcolor=#E9E9E9
| 314732 ||  || — || September 18, 2006 || Kitt Peak || Spacewatch || — || align=right | 1.3 km || 
|-id=733 bgcolor=#E9E9E9
| 314733 ||  || — || September 18, 2006 || Kitt Peak || Spacewatch || — || align=right | 1.4 km || 
|-id=734 bgcolor=#E9E9E9
| 314734 ||  || — || September 19, 2006 || Kitt Peak || Spacewatch || — || align=right data-sort-value="0.98" | 980 m || 
|-id=735 bgcolor=#E9E9E9
| 314735 ||  || — || September 19, 2006 || Catalina || CSS || — || align=right data-sort-value="0.95" | 950 m || 
|-id=736 bgcolor=#E9E9E9
| 314736 ||  || — || September 22, 2006 || Catalina || CSS || — || align=right | 1.5 km || 
|-id=737 bgcolor=#E9E9E9
| 314737 ||  || — || September 24, 2006 || Kitt Peak || Spacewatch || — || align=right data-sort-value="0.85" | 850 m || 
|-id=738 bgcolor=#E9E9E9
| 314738 ||  || — || September 19, 2006 || Catalina || CSS || — || align=right | 1.6 km || 
|-id=739 bgcolor=#E9E9E9
| 314739 ||  || — || September 19, 2006 || Catalina || CSS || — || align=right | 1.7 km || 
|-id=740 bgcolor=#E9E9E9
| 314740 ||  || — || September 24, 2006 || Anderson Mesa || LONEOS || — || align=right | 2.0 km || 
|-id=741 bgcolor=#E9E9E9
| 314741 ||  || — || September 24, 2006 || Anderson Mesa || LONEOS || EUN || align=right | 1.5 km || 
|-id=742 bgcolor=#E9E9E9
| 314742 ||  || — || September 19, 2006 || Kitt Peak || Spacewatch || — || align=right data-sort-value="0.91" | 910 m || 
|-id=743 bgcolor=#E9E9E9
| 314743 ||  || — || September 19, 2006 || Kitt Peak || Spacewatch || — || align=right | 1.3 km || 
|-id=744 bgcolor=#E9E9E9
| 314744 ||  || — || September 23, 2006 || Kitt Peak || Spacewatch || — || align=right | 1.8 km || 
|-id=745 bgcolor=#E9E9E9
| 314745 ||  || — || September 25, 2006 || Kitt Peak || Spacewatch || — || align=right | 2.1 km || 
|-id=746 bgcolor=#E9E9E9
| 314746 ||  || — || September 25, 2006 || Mount Lemmon || Mount Lemmon Survey || — || align=right | 2.3 km || 
|-id=747 bgcolor=#E9E9E9
| 314747 ||  || — || September 26, 2006 || Kitt Peak || Spacewatch || — || align=right | 1.4 km || 
|-id=748 bgcolor=#E9E9E9
| 314748 ||  || — || September 27, 2006 || Vail-Jarnac || Jarnac Obs. || — || align=right | 2.3 km || 
|-id=749 bgcolor=#E9E9E9
| 314749 ||  || — || September 24, 2006 || Kitt Peak || Spacewatch || — || align=right | 1.1 km || 
|-id=750 bgcolor=#E9E9E9
| 314750 ||  || — || September 26, 2006 || Kitt Peak || Spacewatch || JUN || align=right | 1.2 km || 
|-id=751 bgcolor=#E9E9E9
| 314751 ||  || — || September 28, 2006 || Kitt Peak || Spacewatch || — || align=right | 1.7 km || 
|-id=752 bgcolor=#fefefe
| 314752 ||  || — || September 26, 2006 || Mount Lemmon || Mount Lemmon Survey || NYS || align=right data-sort-value="0.74" | 740 m || 
|-id=753 bgcolor=#E9E9E9
| 314753 ||  || — || September 26, 2006 || Kitt Peak || Spacewatch || — || align=right | 1.5 km || 
|-id=754 bgcolor=#E9E9E9
| 314754 ||  || — || October 13, 1998 || Kitt Peak || Spacewatch || — || align=right | 1.3 km || 
|-id=755 bgcolor=#E9E9E9
| 314755 ||  || — || September 27, 2006 || Kitt Peak || Spacewatch || — || align=right | 1.0 km || 
|-id=756 bgcolor=#E9E9E9
| 314756 ||  || — || September 27, 2006 || Kitt Peak || Spacewatch || — || align=right | 1.1 km || 
|-id=757 bgcolor=#fefefe
| 314757 ||  || — || September 27, 2006 || Kitt Peak || Spacewatch || — || align=right | 1.4 km || 
|-id=758 bgcolor=#E9E9E9
| 314758 ||  || — || September 27, 2006 || Kitt Peak || Spacewatch || — || align=right | 1.3 km || 
|-id=759 bgcolor=#E9E9E9
| 314759 ||  || — || September 27, 2006 || Kitt Peak || Spacewatch || — || align=right | 1.2 km || 
|-id=760 bgcolor=#E9E9E9
| 314760 ||  || — || September 27, 2006 || Kitt Peak || Spacewatch || — || align=right | 1.3 km || 
|-id=761 bgcolor=#E9E9E9
| 314761 ||  || — || September 28, 2006 || Kitt Peak || Spacewatch || — || align=right data-sort-value="0.97" | 970 m || 
|-id=762 bgcolor=#E9E9E9
| 314762 ||  || — || September 28, 2006 || Kitt Peak || Spacewatch || — || align=right | 1.7 km || 
|-id=763 bgcolor=#E9E9E9
| 314763 ||  || — || September 28, 2006 || Kitt Peak || Spacewatch || RAF || align=right data-sort-value="0.99" | 990 m || 
|-id=764 bgcolor=#E9E9E9
| 314764 ||  || — || September 28, 2006 || Kitt Peak || Spacewatch || — || align=right data-sort-value="0.99" | 990 m || 
|-id=765 bgcolor=#E9E9E9
| 314765 ||  || — || September 29, 2006 || Anderson Mesa || LONEOS || — || align=right | 2.4 km || 
|-id=766 bgcolor=#E9E9E9
| 314766 ||  || — || September 30, 2006 || Catalina || CSS || — || align=right | 1.6 km || 
|-id=767 bgcolor=#E9E9E9
| 314767 ||  || — || September 30, 2006 || Mount Lemmon || Mount Lemmon Survey || — || align=right | 1.4 km || 
|-id=768 bgcolor=#E9E9E9
| 314768 ||  || — || September 30, 2006 || Mount Lemmon || Mount Lemmon Survey || — || align=right data-sort-value="0.93" | 930 m || 
|-id=769 bgcolor=#E9E9E9
| 314769 ||  || — || September 30, 2006 || Mount Lemmon || Mount Lemmon Survey || — || align=right | 2.3 km || 
|-id=770 bgcolor=#E9E9E9
| 314770 ||  || — || September 30, 2006 || Mount Lemmon || Mount Lemmon Survey || — || align=right | 2.2 km || 
|-id=771 bgcolor=#E9E9E9
| 314771 ||  || — || September 25, 2006 || Catalina || CSS || EUN || align=right | 1.8 km || 
|-id=772 bgcolor=#E9E9E9
| 314772 ||  || — || September 27, 2006 || Mount Lemmon || Mount Lemmon Survey || — || align=right | 1.1 km || 
|-id=773 bgcolor=#E9E9E9
| 314773 ||  || — || September 18, 2006 || Apache Point || A. C. Becker || — || align=right | 2.1 km || 
|-id=774 bgcolor=#E9E9E9
| 314774 ||  || — || September 30, 2006 || Apache Point || A. C. Becker || EUN || align=right | 1.4 km || 
|-id=775 bgcolor=#E9E9E9
| 314775 ||  || — || September 30, 2006 || Apache Point || A. C. Becker || — || align=right | 2.0 km || 
|-id=776 bgcolor=#E9E9E9
| 314776 ||  || — || September 16, 2006 || Kitt Peak || Spacewatch || MIS || align=right | 2.7 km || 
|-id=777 bgcolor=#E9E9E9
| 314777 ||  || — || September 18, 2006 || Kitt Peak || Spacewatch || EUN || align=right | 1.3 km || 
|-id=778 bgcolor=#fefefe
| 314778 ||  || — || September 19, 2006 || Kitt Peak || Spacewatch || — || align=right data-sort-value="0.87" | 870 m || 
|-id=779 bgcolor=#E9E9E9
| 314779 ||  || — || September 27, 2006 || Mount Lemmon || Mount Lemmon Survey || — || align=right | 1.5 km || 
|-id=780 bgcolor=#E9E9E9
| 314780 ||  || — || September 27, 2006 || Kitt Peak || Spacewatch || KON || align=right | 2.7 km || 
|-id=781 bgcolor=#E9E9E9
| 314781 ||  || — || September 25, 2006 || Mount Lemmon || Mount Lemmon Survey || — || align=right data-sort-value="0.96" | 960 m || 
|-id=782 bgcolor=#E9E9E9
| 314782 ||  || — || September 22, 2006 || Catalina || CSS || — || align=right | 2.8 km || 
|-id=783 bgcolor=#E9E9E9
| 314783 ||  || — || October 10, 2006 || Palomar || NEAT || — || align=right | 1.6 km || 
|-id=784 bgcolor=#E9E9E9
| 314784 ||  || — || October 11, 2006 || Kitt Peak || Spacewatch || MIS || align=right | 2.7 km || 
|-id=785 bgcolor=#E9E9E9
| 314785 ||  || — || October 11, 2006 || Kitt Peak || Spacewatch || — || align=right | 2.0 km || 
|-id=786 bgcolor=#E9E9E9
| 314786 ||  || — || October 11, 2006 || Kitt Peak || Spacewatch || — || align=right | 1.9 km || 
|-id=787 bgcolor=#E9E9E9
| 314787 ||  || — || October 11, 2006 || Kitt Peak || Spacewatch || — || align=right | 3.2 km || 
|-id=788 bgcolor=#E9E9E9
| 314788 ||  || — || October 11, 2006 || Kitt Peak || Spacewatch || — || align=right | 1.5 km || 
|-id=789 bgcolor=#E9E9E9
| 314789 ||  || — || September 28, 2006 || Mount Lemmon || Mount Lemmon Survey || PAD || align=right | 1.7 km || 
|-id=790 bgcolor=#E9E9E9
| 314790 ||  || — || October 11, 2006 || Kitt Peak || Spacewatch || — || align=right | 1.9 km || 
|-id=791 bgcolor=#E9E9E9
| 314791 ||  || — || October 12, 2006 || Kitt Peak || Spacewatch || NEM || align=right | 2.4 km || 
|-id=792 bgcolor=#E9E9E9
| 314792 ||  || — || October 12, 2006 || Kitt Peak || Spacewatch || — || align=right | 1.6 km || 
|-id=793 bgcolor=#E9E9E9
| 314793 ||  || — || October 12, 2006 || Kitt Peak || Spacewatch || — || align=right | 1.5 km || 
|-id=794 bgcolor=#E9E9E9
| 314794 ||  || — || October 12, 2006 || Kitt Peak || Spacewatch || — || align=right | 1.8 km || 
|-id=795 bgcolor=#E9E9E9
| 314795 ||  || — || October 12, 2006 || Kitt Peak || Spacewatch || — || align=right | 3.0 km || 
|-id=796 bgcolor=#E9E9E9
| 314796 ||  || — || October 12, 2006 || Kitt Peak || Spacewatch || — || align=right | 1.5 km || 
|-id=797 bgcolor=#E9E9E9
| 314797 ||  || — || October 12, 2006 || Kitt Peak || Spacewatch || — || align=right | 3.0 km || 
|-id=798 bgcolor=#E9E9E9
| 314798 ||  || — || October 12, 2006 || Palomar || NEAT || — || align=right | 1.6 km || 
|-id=799 bgcolor=#E9E9E9
| 314799 ||  || — || October 12, 2006 || Kitt Peak || Spacewatch || HNA || align=right | 2.8 km || 
|-id=800 bgcolor=#E9E9E9
| 314800 ||  || — || October 9, 2006 || Palomar || NEAT || — || align=right | 1.8 km || 
|}

314801–314900 

|-bgcolor=#E9E9E9
| 314801 ||  || — || October 11, 2006 || Palomar || NEAT || EUN || align=right | 1.6 km || 
|-id=802 bgcolor=#E9E9E9
| 314802 ||  || — || October 11, 2006 || Palomar || NEAT || MAR || align=right | 1.3 km || 
|-id=803 bgcolor=#E9E9E9
| 314803 ||  || — || October 13, 2006 || Kitt Peak || Spacewatch || — || align=right | 3.5 km || 
|-id=804 bgcolor=#E9E9E9
| 314804 ||  || — || October 15, 2006 || Kitt Peak || Spacewatch || — || align=right | 1.4 km || 
|-id=805 bgcolor=#E9E9E9
| 314805 ||  || — || October 15, 2006 || Lulin Observatory || C.-S. Lin, Q.-z. Ye || — || align=right | 1.8 km || 
|-id=806 bgcolor=#E9E9E9
| 314806 ||  || — || October 2, 2006 || Siding Spring || SSS || — || align=right | 2.5 km || 
|-id=807 bgcolor=#E9E9E9
| 314807 ||  || — || October 15, 2006 || Kitt Peak || Spacewatch || — || align=right | 1.8 km || 
|-id=808 bgcolor=#E9E9E9
| 314808 Martindutertre ||  ||  || October 15, 2006 || San Marcello || L. Tesi, G. Fagioli || MAR || align=right | 2.1 km || 
|-id=809 bgcolor=#E9E9E9
| 314809 ||  || — || October 16, 2006 || Kitt Peak || Spacewatch || — || align=right | 2.2 km || 
|-id=810 bgcolor=#E9E9E9
| 314810 ||  || — || October 16, 2006 || Catalina || CSS || — || align=right | 1.8 km || 
|-id=811 bgcolor=#E9E9E9
| 314811 ||  || — || October 17, 2006 || Mount Lemmon || Mount Lemmon Survey || HEN || align=right | 1.0 km || 
|-id=812 bgcolor=#E9E9E9
| 314812 ||  || — || October 17, 2006 || Mount Lemmon || Mount Lemmon Survey || — || align=right | 1.5 km || 
|-id=813 bgcolor=#E9E9E9
| 314813 ||  || — || October 16, 2006 || Kitt Peak || Spacewatch || — || align=right | 1.1 km || 
|-id=814 bgcolor=#E9E9E9
| 314814 ||  || — || October 16, 2006 || Kitt Peak || Spacewatch || — || align=right | 1.6 km || 
|-id=815 bgcolor=#E9E9E9
| 314815 ||  || — || October 16, 2006 || Kitt Peak || Spacewatch || — || align=right | 1.6 km || 
|-id=816 bgcolor=#E9E9E9
| 314816 ||  || — || October 16, 2006 || Kitt Peak || Spacewatch || — || align=right | 1.9 km || 
|-id=817 bgcolor=#E9E9E9
| 314817 ||  || — || October 16, 2006 || Kitt Peak || Spacewatch || — || align=right | 1.6 km || 
|-id=818 bgcolor=#E9E9E9
| 314818 ||  || — || October 16, 2006 || Kitt Peak || Spacewatch || AGN || align=right | 1.0 km || 
|-id=819 bgcolor=#E9E9E9
| 314819 ||  || — || October 16, 2006 || Kitt Peak || Spacewatch || — || align=right | 1.6 km || 
|-id=820 bgcolor=#fefefe
| 314820 ||  || — || October 16, 2006 || Bergisch Gladbac || W. Bickel || NYS || align=right data-sort-value="0.94" | 940 m || 
|-id=821 bgcolor=#E9E9E9
| 314821 ||  || — || October 17, 2006 || Kitt Peak || Spacewatch || — || align=right | 1.5 km || 
|-id=822 bgcolor=#E9E9E9
| 314822 ||  || — || October 16, 2006 || Catalina || CSS || — || align=right | 3.0 km || 
|-id=823 bgcolor=#E9E9E9
| 314823 ||  || — || October 16, 2006 || Catalina || CSS || — || align=right | 2.3 km || 
|-id=824 bgcolor=#E9E9E9
| 314824 ||  || — || October 16, 2006 || Catalina || CSS || — || align=right | 1.9 km || 
|-id=825 bgcolor=#E9E9E9
| 314825 ||  || — || October 17, 2006 || Kitt Peak || Spacewatch || — || align=right | 1.7 km || 
|-id=826 bgcolor=#E9E9E9
| 314826 ||  || — || October 17, 2006 || Kitt Peak || Spacewatch || — || align=right | 1.1 km || 
|-id=827 bgcolor=#E9E9E9
| 314827 ||  || — || October 17, 2006 || Mount Lemmon || Mount Lemmon Survey || HEN || align=right | 1.3 km || 
|-id=828 bgcolor=#E9E9E9
| 314828 ||  || — || October 18, 2006 || Kitt Peak || Spacewatch || — || align=right | 1.3 km || 
|-id=829 bgcolor=#E9E9E9
| 314829 ||  || — || October 18, 2006 || Kitt Peak || Spacewatch || — || align=right | 1.1 km || 
|-id=830 bgcolor=#E9E9E9
| 314830 ||  || — || October 18, 2006 || Kitt Peak || Spacewatch || — || align=right | 2.1 km || 
|-id=831 bgcolor=#E9E9E9
| 314831 ||  || — || October 18, 2006 || Kitt Peak || Spacewatch || — || align=right | 1.1 km || 
|-id=832 bgcolor=#E9E9E9
| 314832 ||  || — || October 18, 2006 || Kitt Peak || Spacewatch || — || align=right | 2.7 km || 
|-id=833 bgcolor=#E9E9E9
| 314833 ||  || — || October 18, 2006 || Kitt Peak || Spacewatch || — || align=right | 2.2 km || 
|-id=834 bgcolor=#E9E9E9
| 314834 ||  || — || October 18, 2006 || Kitt Peak || Spacewatch || MAR || align=right | 1.4 km || 
|-id=835 bgcolor=#E9E9E9
| 314835 ||  || — || October 19, 2006 || Kitt Peak || Spacewatch || — || align=right | 1.4 km || 
|-id=836 bgcolor=#E9E9E9
| 314836 ||  || — || October 19, 2006 || Kitt Peak || Spacewatch || — || align=right | 1.6 km || 
|-id=837 bgcolor=#E9E9E9
| 314837 ||  || — || October 19, 2006 || Mount Lemmon || Mount Lemmon Survey || — || align=right | 1.9 km || 
|-id=838 bgcolor=#E9E9E9
| 314838 ||  || — || October 21, 2006 || Mount Lemmon || Mount Lemmon Survey || — || align=right | 1.4 km || 
|-id=839 bgcolor=#E9E9E9
| 314839 ||  || — || October 21, 2006 || Mount Lemmon || Mount Lemmon Survey || — || align=right data-sort-value="0.98" | 980 m || 
|-id=840 bgcolor=#E9E9E9
| 314840 ||  || — || October 21, 2006 || Mount Lemmon || Mount Lemmon Survey || — || align=right | 1.5 km || 
|-id=841 bgcolor=#E9E9E9
| 314841 ||  || — || October 16, 2006 || Catalina || CSS || HNS || align=right | 1.7 km || 
|-id=842 bgcolor=#E9E9E9
| 314842 ||  || — || September 30, 2006 || Catalina || CSS || — || align=right | 1.7 km || 
|-id=843 bgcolor=#E9E9E9
| 314843 ||  || — || January 10, 1999 || Xinglong || SCAP || RAF || align=right | 1.3 km || 
|-id=844 bgcolor=#E9E9E9
| 314844 ||  || — || October 17, 2006 || Catalina || CSS || — || align=right | 1.4 km || 
|-id=845 bgcolor=#E9E9E9
| 314845 ||  || — || October 20, 2006 || Catalina || CSS || — || align=right | 1.9 km || 
|-id=846 bgcolor=#E9E9E9
| 314846 ||  || — || October 19, 2006 || Catalina || CSS || — || align=right | 1.7 km || 
|-id=847 bgcolor=#E9E9E9
| 314847 ||  || — || October 19, 2006 || Catalina || CSS || EUN || align=right | 1.4 km || 
|-id=848 bgcolor=#E9E9E9
| 314848 ||  || — || October 19, 2006 || Catalina || CSS || — || align=right | 2.4 km || 
|-id=849 bgcolor=#E9E9E9
| 314849 ||  || — || October 19, 2006 || Palomar || NEAT || — || align=right | 3.1 km || 
|-id=850 bgcolor=#E9E9E9
| 314850 ||  || — || October 20, 2006 || Kitt Peak || Spacewatch || — || align=right | 1.5 km || 
|-id=851 bgcolor=#E9E9E9
| 314851 ||  || — || October 21, 2006 || Catalina || CSS || — || align=right | 1.7 km || 
|-id=852 bgcolor=#E9E9E9
| 314852 ||  || — || October 21, 2006 || Kitt Peak || Spacewatch || — || align=right | 2.2 km || 
|-id=853 bgcolor=#E9E9E9
| 314853 ||  || — || October 29, 2006 || Kitami || K. Endate || — || align=right | 1.7 km || 
|-id=854 bgcolor=#E9E9E9
| 314854 ||  || — || October 20, 2006 || Palomar || NEAT || AEO || align=right | 1.6 km || 
|-id=855 bgcolor=#E9E9E9
| 314855 ||  || — || October 21, 2006 || Palomar || NEAT || — || align=right | 1.1 km || 
|-id=856 bgcolor=#E9E9E9
| 314856 ||  || — || October 21, 2006 || Palomar || NEAT || — || align=right | 1.6 km || 
|-id=857 bgcolor=#E9E9E9
| 314857 ||  || — || October 21, 2006 || Palomar || NEAT || MIS || align=right | 3.5 km || 
|-id=858 bgcolor=#E9E9E9
| 314858 ||  || — || October 23, 2006 || Kitt Peak || Spacewatch || — || align=right | 1.7 km || 
|-id=859 bgcolor=#E9E9E9
| 314859 ||  || — || October 23, 2006 || Kitt Peak || Spacewatch || — || align=right | 1.3 km || 
|-id=860 bgcolor=#E9E9E9
| 314860 ||  || — || October 27, 2006 || Mount Lemmon || Mount Lemmon Survey || — || align=right data-sort-value="0.99" | 990 m || 
|-id=861 bgcolor=#E9E9E9
| 314861 ||  || — || October 27, 2006 || Mount Lemmon || Mount Lemmon Survey || — || align=right | 1.1 km || 
|-id=862 bgcolor=#E9E9E9
| 314862 ||  || — || October 27, 2006 || Mount Lemmon || Mount Lemmon Survey || — || align=right | 1.3 km || 
|-id=863 bgcolor=#E9E9E9
| 314863 ||  || — || October 27, 2006 || Mount Lemmon || Mount Lemmon Survey || — || align=right | 1.1 km || 
|-id=864 bgcolor=#E9E9E9
| 314864 ||  || — || October 27, 2006 || Catalina || CSS || INO || align=right | 1.5 km || 
|-id=865 bgcolor=#E9E9E9
| 314865 ||  || — || October 28, 2006 || Mount Lemmon || Mount Lemmon Survey || — || align=right | 1.5 km || 
|-id=866 bgcolor=#E9E9E9
| 314866 ||  || — || October 27, 2006 || Catalina || CSS || — || align=right | 1.3 km || 
|-id=867 bgcolor=#E9E9E9
| 314867 ||  || — || October 27, 2006 || Mount Lemmon || Mount Lemmon Survey || — || align=right | 1.4 km || 
|-id=868 bgcolor=#E9E9E9
| 314868 ||  || — || October 27, 2006 || Kitt Peak || Spacewatch || — || align=right | 2.1 km || 
|-id=869 bgcolor=#E9E9E9
| 314869 ||  || — || October 28, 2006 || Kitt Peak || Spacewatch || — || align=right | 1.4 km || 
|-id=870 bgcolor=#E9E9E9
| 314870 ||  || — || October 28, 2006 || Mount Lemmon || Mount Lemmon Survey || HEN || align=right data-sort-value="0.98" | 980 m || 
|-id=871 bgcolor=#E9E9E9
| 314871 ||  || — || October 29, 2006 || Catalina || CSS || GEF || align=right | 2.4 km || 
|-id=872 bgcolor=#E9E9E9
| 314872 ||  || — || October 17, 2006 || Catalina || CSS || MAR || align=right | 2.2 km || 
|-id=873 bgcolor=#E9E9E9
| 314873 ||  || — || October 21, 2006 || Kitt Peak || Spacewatch || MIS || align=right | 2.6 km || 
|-id=874 bgcolor=#E9E9E9
| 314874 ||  || — || November 9, 2006 || Kitt Peak || Spacewatch || — || align=right | 2.9 km || 
|-id=875 bgcolor=#E9E9E9
| 314875 ||  || — || November 10, 2006 || Kitt Peak || Spacewatch || — || align=right | 2.9 km || 
|-id=876 bgcolor=#E9E9E9
| 314876 ||  || — || November 9, 2006 || Kitt Peak || Spacewatch || — || align=right | 1.6 km || 
|-id=877 bgcolor=#E9E9E9
| 314877 ||  || — || November 9, 2006 || Kitt Peak || Spacewatch || — || align=right | 2.1 km || 
|-id=878 bgcolor=#E9E9E9
| 314878 ||  || — || November 10, 2006 || Kitt Peak || Spacewatch || — || align=right | 1.8 km || 
|-id=879 bgcolor=#E9E9E9
| 314879 ||  || — || November 10, 2006 || Kitt Peak || Spacewatch || — || align=right | 1.5 km || 
|-id=880 bgcolor=#E9E9E9
| 314880 ||  || — || November 10, 2006 || Kitt Peak || Spacewatch || — || align=right | 2.4 km || 
|-id=881 bgcolor=#E9E9E9
| 314881 ||  || — || November 11, 2006 || Catalina || CSS || — || align=right | 2.4 km || 
|-id=882 bgcolor=#E9E9E9
| 314882 ||  || — || November 11, 2006 || Palomar || NEAT || — || align=right | 3.4 km || 
|-id=883 bgcolor=#d6d6d6
| 314883 ||  || — || November 12, 2006 || Mount Lemmon || Mount Lemmon Survey || KOR || align=right | 1.3 km || 
|-id=884 bgcolor=#E9E9E9
| 314884 ||  || — || November 9, 2006 || Kitt Peak || Spacewatch || — || align=right | 2.5 km || 
|-id=885 bgcolor=#E9E9E9
| 314885 ||  || — || November 9, 2006 || Kitt Peak || Spacewatch || WIT || align=right data-sort-value="0.89" | 890 m || 
|-id=886 bgcolor=#E9E9E9
| 314886 ||  || — || November 9, 2006 || Kitt Peak || Spacewatch || — || align=right | 1.3 km || 
|-id=887 bgcolor=#E9E9E9
| 314887 ||  || — || November 10, 2006 || Kitt Peak || Spacewatch || — || align=right | 1.2 km || 
|-id=888 bgcolor=#E9E9E9
| 314888 ||  || — || November 10, 2006 || Kitt Peak || Spacewatch || — || align=right | 2.4 km || 
|-id=889 bgcolor=#E9E9E9
| 314889 ||  || — || November 11, 2006 || Kitt Peak || Spacewatch || NEM || align=right | 2.2 km || 
|-id=890 bgcolor=#E9E9E9
| 314890 ||  || — || November 11, 2006 || Kitt Peak || Spacewatch || — || align=right | 1.9 km || 
|-id=891 bgcolor=#E9E9E9
| 314891 ||  || — || November 11, 2006 || Kitt Peak || Spacewatch || — || align=right | 1.5 km || 
|-id=892 bgcolor=#E9E9E9
| 314892 ||  || — || November 11, 2006 || Kitt Peak || Spacewatch || — || align=right | 2.5 km || 
|-id=893 bgcolor=#E9E9E9
| 314893 ||  || — || November 11, 2006 || Kitt Peak || Spacewatch || — || align=right | 1.3 km || 
|-id=894 bgcolor=#E9E9E9
| 314894 ||  || — || November 11, 2006 || Kitt Peak || Spacewatch || — || align=right | 2.3 km || 
|-id=895 bgcolor=#E9E9E9
| 314895 ||  || — || November 11, 2006 || Mount Lemmon || Mount Lemmon Survey || HEN || align=right data-sort-value="0.96" | 960 m || 
|-id=896 bgcolor=#E9E9E9
| 314896 ||  || — || November 12, 2006 || Mount Lemmon || Mount Lemmon Survey || — || align=right | 2.9 km || 
|-id=897 bgcolor=#E9E9E9
| 314897 ||  || — || November 12, 2006 || Mount Lemmon || Mount Lemmon Survey || HEN || align=right | 1.1 km || 
|-id=898 bgcolor=#E9E9E9
| 314898 ||  || — || November 13, 2006 || Kitt Peak || Spacewatch || — || align=right | 1.4 km || 
|-id=899 bgcolor=#E9E9E9
| 314899 ||  || — || November 13, 2006 || Mount Lemmon || Mount Lemmon Survey || — || align=right data-sort-value="0.93" | 930 m || 
|-id=900 bgcolor=#d6d6d6
| 314900 ||  || — || November 14, 2006 || Socorro || LINEAR || 615 || align=right | 2.0 km || 
|}

314901–315000 

|-bgcolor=#E9E9E9
| 314901 ||  || — || November 15, 2006 || Mount Lemmon || Mount Lemmon Survey || — || align=right | 1.7 km || 
|-id=902 bgcolor=#E9E9E9
| 314902 ||  || — || November 15, 2006 || Wildberg || R. Apitzsch || — || align=right | 1.7 km || 
|-id=903 bgcolor=#E9E9E9
| 314903 ||  || — || November 12, 2006 || Mount Lemmon || Mount Lemmon Survey || — || align=right | 1.5 km || 
|-id=904 bgcolor=#E9E9E9
| 314904 ||  || — || November 12, 2006 || Mount Lemmon || Mount Lemmon Survey || — || align=right | 3.6 km || 
|-id=905 bgcolor=#E9E9E9
| 314905 ||  || — || October 17, 2006 || Catalina || CSS || — || align=right | 2.1 km || 
|-id=906 bgcolor=#E9E9E9
| 314906 ||  || — || November 14, 2006 || Kitt Peak || Spacewatch || — || align=right | 1.3 km || 
|-id=907 bgcolor=#E9E9E9
| 314907 ||  || — || November 14, 2006 || Kitt Peak || Spacewatch || HEN || align=right | 1.0 km || 
|-id=908 bgcolor=#E9E9E9
| 314908 ||  || — || November 14, 2006 || Kitt Peak || Spacewatch || — || align=right | 1.7 km || 
|-id=909 bgcolor=#E9E9E9
| 314909 ||  || — || November 14, 2006 || Kitt Peak || Spacewatch || — || align=right | 2.1 km || 
|-id=910 bgcolor=#E9E9E9
| 314910 ||  || — || November 15, 2006 || Kitt Peak || Spacewatch || CLO || align=right | 2.3 km || 
|-id=911 bgcolor=#E9E9E9
| 314911 ||  || — || November 15, 2006 || Catalina || CSS || 526 || align=right | 2.9 km || 
|-id=912 bgcolor=#E9E9E9
| 314912 ||  || — || November 15, 2006 || Catalina || CSS || — || align=right | 2.7 km || 
|-id=913 bgcolor=#E9E9E9
| 314913 ||  || — || November 9, 2006 || Palomar || NEAT || WIT || align=right | 1.2 km || 
|-id=914 bgcolor=#E9E9E9
| 314914 ||  || — || November 8, 2006 || Palomar || NEAT || — || align=right | 2.9 km || 
|-id=915 bgcolor=#d6d6d6
| 314915 ||  || — || November 1, 2006 || Kitt Peak || Spacewatch || — || align=right | 3.4 km || 
|-id=916 bgcolor=#E9E9E9
| 314916 ||  || — || November 16, 2006 || Kitt Peak || Spacewatch || — || align=right | 4.0 km || 
|-id=917 bgcolor=#E9E9E9
| 314917 ||  || — || November 16, 2006 || Mount Lemmon || Mount Lemmon Survey || MRX || align=right | 1.1 km || 
|-id=918 bgcolor=#E9E9E9
| 314918 ||  || — || November 17, 2006 || Kitt Peak || Spacewatch || MRX || align=right data-sort-value="0.97" | 970 m || 
|-id=919 bgcolor=#E9E9E9
| 314919 ||  || — || November 17, 2006 || Mount Lemmon || Mount Lemmon Survey || — || align=right | 1.5 km || 
|-id=920 bgcolor=#E9E9E9
| 314920 ||  || — || November 17, 2006 || Mount Lemmon || Mount Lemmon Survey || — || align=right | 2.0 km || 
|-id=921 bgcolor=#E9E9E9
| 314921 ||  || — || November 17, 2006 || Mount Lemmon || Mount Lemmon Survey || — || align=right | 2.3 km || 
|-id=922 bgcolor=#E9E9E9
| 314922 ||  || — || November 21, 2006 || Great Shefford || P. Birtwhistle || MAR || align=right | 1.5 km || 
|-id=923 bgcolor=#E9E9E9
| 314923 ||  || — || November 16, 2006 || Catalina || CSS || — || align=right | 2.4 km || 
|-id=924 bgcolor=#E9E9E9
| 314924 ||  || — || November 16, 2006 || Kitt Peak || Spacewatch || — || align=right | 1.1 km || 
|-id=925 bgcolor=#E9E9E9
| 314925 ||  || — || November 16, 2006 || Kitt Peak || Spacewatch || — || align=right | 2.0 km || 
|-id=926 bgcolor=#E9E9E9
| 314926 ||  || — || November 16, 2006 || Kitt Peak || Spacewatch || — || align=right | 1.6 km || 
|-id=927 bgcolor=#E9E9E9
| 314927 ||  || — || October 25, 2001 || Apache Point || SDSS || — || align=right | 2.6 km || 
|-id=928 bgcolor=#E9E9E9
| 314928 ||  || — || May 10, 2004 || Kitt Peak || Spacewatch || — || align=right | 2.4 km || 
|-id=929 bgcolor=#E9E9E9
| 314929 ||  || — || November 16, 2006 || Catalina || CSS || MAR || align=right | 1.8 km || 
|-id=930 bgcolor=#E9E9E9
| 314930 ||  || — || November 16, 2006 || Catalina || CSS || — || align=right | 2.6 km || 
|-id=931 bgcolor=#E9E9E9
| 314931 ||  || — || November 16, 2006 || Kitt Peak || Spacewatch || — || align=right | 3.1 km || 
|-id=932 bgcolor=#E9E9E9
| 314932 ||  || — || November 16, 2006 || Kitt Peak || Spacewatch || HEN || align=right | 1.1 km || 
|-id=933 bgcolor=#d6d6d6
| 314933 ||  || — || November 17, 2006 || Kitt Peak || Spacewatch || — || align=right | 3.6 km || 
|-id=934 bgcolor=#E9E9E9
| 314934 ||  || — || November 17, 2006 || Mount Lemmon || Mount Lemmon Survey || — || align=right | 1.7 km || 
|-id=935 bgcolor=#E9E9E9
| 314935 ||  || — || November 17, 2006 || Mount Lemmon || Mount Lemmon Survey || — || align=right | 2.6 km || 
|-id=936 bgcolor=#E9E9E9
| 314936 ||  || — || November 18, 2006 || Kitt Peak || Spacewatch || — || align=right | 2.1 km || 
|-id=937 bgcolor=#E9E9E9
| 314937 ||  || — || November 19, 2006 || Kitt Peak || Spacewatch || — || align=right | 2.0 km || 
|-id=938 bgcolor=#E9E9E9
| 314938 ||  || — || November 19, 2006 || Kitt Peak || Spacewatch || — || align=right | 2.3 km || 
|-id=939 bgcolor=#d6d6d6
| 314939 ||  || — || November 19, 2006 || Kitt Peak || Spacewatch || — || align=right | 2.6 km || 
|-id=940 bgcolor=#E9E9E9
| 314940 ||  || — || November 19, 2006 || Catalina || CSS || MAR || align=right | 1.5 km || 
|-id=941 bgcolor=#E9E9E9
| 314941 ||  || — || November 19, 2006 || Catalina || CSS || — || align=right | 2.0 km || 
|-id=942 bgcolor=#E9E9E9
| 314942 ||  || — || November 19, 2006 || Catalina || CSS || — || align=right | 3.0 km || 
|-id=943 bgcolor=#E9E9E9
| 314943 ||  || — || November 19, 2006 || Catalina || CSS || — || align=right | 2.0 km || 
|-id=944 bgcolor=#E9E9E9
| 314944 ||  || — || November 19, 2006 || Kitt Peak || Spacewatch || WIT || align=right | 1.2 km || 
|-id=945 bgcolor=#E9E9E9
| 314945 ||  || — || November 19, 2006 || Kitt Peak || Spacewatch || MRX || align=right | 1.1 km || 
|-id=946 bgcolor=#E9E9E9
| 314946 ||  || — || November 19, 2006 || Kitt Peak || Spacewatch || — || align=right | 2.2 km || 
|-id=947 bgcolor=#E9E9E9
| 314947 ||  || — || November 19, 2006 || Catalina || CSS || — || align=right | 2.9 km || 
|-id=948 bgcolor=#d6d6d6
| 314948 ||  || — || November 19, 2006 || Kitt Peak || Spacewatch || — || align=right | 3.4 km || 
|-id=949 bgcolor=#E9E9E9
| 314949 ||  || — || November 20, 2006 || Kitt Peak || Spacewatch || — || align=right | 1.1 km || 
|-id=950 bgcolor=#E9E9E9
| 314950 ||  || — || November 20, 2006 || Socorro || LINEAR || INO || align=right | 3.3 km || 
|-id=951 bgcolor=#E9E9E9
| 314951 ||  || — || November 21, 2006 || Mount Lemmon || Mount Lemmon Survey || — || align=right | 3.1 km || 
|-id=952 bgcolor=#E9E9E9
| 314952 ||  || — || November 18, 2006 || Kitt Peak || Spacewatch || — || align=right | 1.3 km || 
|-id=953 bgcolor=#E9E9E9
| 314953 ||  || — || November 18, 2006 || Mount Lemmon || Mount Lemmon Survey || — || align=right | 1.2 km || 
|-id=954 bgcolor=#E9E9E9
| 314954 ||  || — || November 18, 2006 || Mount Lemmon || Mount Lemmon Survey || — || align=right | 1.2 km || 
|-id=955 bgcolor=#E9E9E9
| 314955 ||  || — || November 20, 2006 || Kitt Peak || Spacewatch || — || align=right | 1.9 km || 
|-id=956 bgcolor=#d6d6d6
| 314956 ||  || — || November 20, 2006 || Socorro || LINEAR || EUP || align=right | 5.8 km || 
|-id=957 bgcolor=#E9E9E9
| 314957 ||  || — || November 23, 2006 || Kitt Peak || Spacewatch || — || align=right | 1.4 km || 
|-id=958 bgcolor=#E9E9E9
| 314958 ||  || — || November 23, 2006 || Kitt Peak || Spacewatch || — || align=right | 1.9 km || 
|-id=959 bgcolor=#E9E9E9
| 314959 ||  || — || March 20, 1999 || Socorro || LINEAR || — || align=right | 2.0 km || 
|-id=960 bgcolor=#E9E9E9
| 314960 ||  || — || November 23, 2006 || Kitt Peak || Spacewatch || AGN || align=right | 1.1 km || 
|-id=961 bgcolor=#E9E9E9
| 314961 ||  || — || November 24, 2006 || Mount Lemmon || Mount Lemmon Survey || — || align=right | 2.1 km || 
|-id=962 bgcolor=#E9E9E9
| 314962 ||  || — || November 25, 2006 || Catalina || CSS || DOR || align=right | 2.6 km || 
|-id=963 bgcolor=#E9E9E9
| 314963 ||  || — || November 27, 2006 || Kitt Peak || Spacewatch || — || align=right | 3.1 km || 
|-id=964 bgcolor=#E9E9E9
| 314964 ||  || — || November 27, 2006 || Kitt Peak || Spacewatch || — || align=right | 1.6 km || 
|-id=965 bgcolor=#E9E9E9
| 314965 ||  || — || November 27, 2006 || Kitt Peak || Spacewatch || AST || align=right | 1.5 km || 
|-id=966 bgcolor=#d6d6d6
| 314966 ||  || — || November 21, 2006 || Mount Lemmon || Mount Lemmon Survey || — || align=right | 2.8 km || 
|-id=967 bgcolor=#d6d6d6
| 314967 ||  || — || November 27, 2006 || Mount Lemmon || Mount Lemmon Survey || NAE || align=right | 3.3 km || 
|-id=968 bgcolor=#E9E9E9
| 314968 || 2006 XE || — || December 9, 2006 || 7300 Observatory || W. K. Y. Yeung || — || align=right | 2.5 km || 
|-id=969 bgcolor=#E9E9E9
| 314969 ||  || — || December 11, 2006 || Socorro || LINEAR || — || align=right | 2.5 km || 
|-id=970 bgcolor=#d6d6d6
| 314970 ||  || — || December 9, 2006 || Palomar || NEAT || TIR || align=right | 4.0 km || 
|-id=971 bgcolor=#E9E9E9
| 314971 ||  || — || December 9, 2006 || Kitt Peak || Spacewatch || — || align=right | 3.3 km || 
|-id=972 bgcolor=#d6d6d6
| 314972 ||  || — || November 14, 2006 || Mount Lemmon || Mount Lemmon Survey || TEL || align=right | 1.8 km || 
|-id=973 bgcolor=#E9E9E9
| 314973 ||  || — || December 10, 2006 || Kitt Peak || Spacewatch || NEM || align=right | 2.2 km || 
|-id=974 bgcolor=#E9E9E9
| 314974 ||  || — || December 10, 2006 || Kitt Peak || Spacewatch || — || align=right | 1.4 km || 
|-id=975 bgcolor=#E9E9E9
| 314975 ||  || — || December 10, 2006 || Kitt Peak || Spacewatch || — || align=right | 3.1 km || 
|-id=976 bgcolor=#E9E9E9
| 314976 ||  || — || December 10, 2006 || Kitt Peak || Spacewatch || — || align=right | 2.5 km || 
|-id=977 bgcolor=#E9E9E9
| 314977 ||  || — || July 29, 2005 || Palomar || NEAT || — || align=right | 3.7 km || 
|-id=978 bgcolor=#E9E9E9
| 314978 ||  || — || December 12, 2006 || Kitt Peak || Spacewatch || — || align=right | 1.9 km || 
|-id=979 bgcolor=#d6d6d6
| 314979 ||  || — || December 13, 2006 || Kitt Peak || Spacewatch || — || align=right | 3.4 km || 
|-id=980 bgcolor=#E9E9E9
| 314980 ||  || — || December 11, 2006 || Kitt Peak || Spacewatch || AGN || align=right | 1.5 km || 
|-id=981 bgcolor=#E9E9E9
| 314981 ||  || — || December 12, 2006 || Palomar || NEAT || — || align=right | 1.5 km || 
|-id=982 bgcolor=#E9E9E9
| 314982 ||  || — || December 12, 2006 || Mount Lemmon || Mount Lemmon Survey || NEM || align=right | 2.9 km || 
|-id=983 bgcolor=#E9E9E9
| 314983 ||  || — || December 12, 2006 || Catalina || CSS || — || align=right | 2.9 km || 
|-id=984 bgcolor=#d6d6d6
| 314984 ||  || — || December 12, 2006 || Mount Lemmon || Mount Lemmon Survey || — || align=right | 2.2 km || 
|-id=985 bgcolor=#E9E9E9
| 314985 ||  || — || December 13, 2006 || Mount Lemmon || Mount Lemmon Survey || AGN || align=right | 1.4 km || 
|-id=986 bgcolor=#E9E9E9
| 314986 ||  || — || December 13, 2006 || Catalina || CSS || MRX || align=right | 1.3 km || 
|-id=987 bgcolor=#E9E9E9
| 314987 ||  || — || December 15, 2006 || Kitt Peak || Spacewatch || — || align=right | 3.0 km || 
|-id=988 bgcolor=#d6d6d6
| 314988 Sireland ||  ||  || December 13, 2006 || Mauna Kea || D. D. Balam || EOS || align=right | 2.3 km || 
|-id=989 bgcolor=#d6d6d6
| 314989 ||  || — || December 12, 2006 || Kitt Peak || Spacewatch || CHA || align=right | 2.5 km || 
|-id=990 bgcolor=#E9E9E9
| 314990 ||  || — || December 17, 2006 || Mount Lemmon || Mount Lemmon Survey || AEO || align=right | 1.3 km || 
|-id=991 bgcolor=#E9E9E9
| 314991 ||  || — || December 20, 2006 || Mount Lemmon || Mount Lemmon Survey || — || align=right | 2.8 km || 
|-id=992 bgcolor=#E9E9E9
| 314992 ||  || — || December 20, 2006 || Farra d'Isonzo || Farra d'Isonzo || — || align=right | 2.6 km || 
|-id=993 bgcolor=#d6d6d6
| 314993 ||  || — || December 20, 2006 || Catalina || CSS || — || align=right | 4.6 km || 
|-id=994 bgcolor=#E9E9E9
| 314994 ||  || — || December 21, 2006 || Kitt Peak || Spacewatch || AGN || align=right | 1.1 km || 
|-id=995 bgcolor=#d6d6d6
| 314995 ||  || — || December 22, 2006 || Kitt Peak || Spacewatch || — || align=right | 2.3 km || 
|-id=996 bgcolor=#d6d6d6
| 314996 ||  || — || December 21, 2006 || Mount Lemmon || Mount Lemmon Survey || CHA || align=right | 2.8 km || 
|-id=997 bgcolor=#E9E9E9
| 314997 ||  || — || January 8, 2007 || Kitt Peak || Spacewatch || — || align=right | 1.6 km || 
|-id=998 bgcolor=#fefefe
| 314998 ||  || — || January 8, 2007 || Kitt Peak || Spacewatch || H || align=right data-sort-value="0.96" | 960 m || 
|-id=999 bgcolor=#d6d6d6
| 314999 ||  || — || December 13, 2006 || Mount Lemmon || Mount Lemmon Survey || — || align=right | 3.0 km || 
|-id=000 bgcolor=#FA8072
| 315000 ||  || — || January 10, 2007 || Mount Lemmon || Mount Lemmon Survey || H || align=right | 1.0 km || 
|}

References

External links 
 Discovery Circumstances: Numbered Minor Planets (310001)–(315000) (IAU Minor Planet Center)

0314